

December 31, 2008 (Wednesday)

American football
NCAA Bowl Games:
Armed Forces Bowl: Houston 34, Air Force 28
Sun Bowl: Oregon State 3, (20) Pittsburgh 0
Music City Bowl: Vanderbilt 16, (24) Boston College 14
 Vandy wins in front of their hometown fans 53 years to the day after the Commodores' last bowl win.
Insight Bowl: Kansas 42, Minnesota 21
Chick-fil-A Bowl: LSU 38, (14) Georgia Tech 3
NFL News:
New England Patriots linebacker Jerod Mayo is named 2008 NFL Defensive Rookie of the Year.

Cricket
Sri Lanka in Bangladesh:
1st Test in Dhaka, day 5:
 293 and 405/6d;  178 and 413 (Mohammad Ashraful 101, Shakib Al Hasan 96). Sri Lanka win by 107 runs and lead 2-match series 1–0.
West Indies in New Zealand:
1st ODI in Queenstown:
 129/5 (Ramnaresh Sarwan 38, Tim Southee 2/33). No result as rain stopped play. Five-match series tied at 0–0.

Ice hockey
World Junior Championships in Ottawa, Ontario, Canada(teams in bold advance to the semifinals, teams in italics advance to the quarterfinals)
Group A (at Scotiabank Place):
 10–2 
 7–4 
Idle: 
Group B (at the Ottawa Civic Centre):
 5–0 
 3–2  (SO)
Idle:

Winter sports

Cross-country skiing
Tour de Ski, stage 4 in Nové Město, Czech Republic:
15 km classic men: (1) Axel Teichmann  39 min 03.7 sec (2) Martin Johnsrud Sundby  39:08.7 (3) Nikolay Chebotko  39:14.2
Overall standings (after four of seven stages): (1) Dario Cologna  1 hr 24:36.9 (2) Vasily Rochev  1 hr 24:53.2 (3) Teichmann 1 hr 24:53.4
10 km classic women: (1) Virpi Kuitunen  24 min 45.4 sec (2) Aino-Kaisa Saarinen  at 37.6 sec (3) Marit Bjørgen  49.9
Overall standings (after four of seven stages): (1) Kuitunen 57:49.3 (2) Saarinen at 5.6 sec (3) Bjørgen 23.0

December 30, 2008 (Tuesday)

American football
NCAA Bowl Games:
Humanitarian Bowl: Maryland 42, Nevada 35
Texas Bowl: Rice 38, Western Michigan 14
 The Owls pick up their first bowl win since 1954, and complete their first 10-win season since 1949.
Holiday Bowl: (17) Oregon 42, (12) Oklahoma State 31
NFL News:
Atlanta Falcons quarterback Matt Ryan is named 2008 NFL Offensive Rookie of the Year.
The Denver Broncos fire head coach Mike Shanahan.

Cricket
South Africa in Australia:
2nd Test in Melbourne, day 5:
 394 and 247;  459 and 183/1 (Graeme Smith 75, Nathan Hauritz 1/41). South Africa win by 9 wickets and lead three-match series 2–0 and becomes the first South African team to win a Test series in Australia.
Sri Lanka in Bangladesh:
1st Test in Dhaka, day 4:
 293 and 405/6d (Mahela Jayawardene 166);  178 and 254/5 (Mohammad Ashraful 70*). Bangladesh require another 267 runs with 5 wickets remaining.

Ice hockey
World Junior Championships in Ottawa, Ontario, Canada
Group A (at Scotiabank Place):
 6–0 
 12–0 
Group B (at the Ottawa Civic Centre):
 8–1 
 5–1

December 29, 2008 (Monday)

American football
NCAA Bowl Games:
PapaJohns.com Bowl: Rutgers 29, North Carolina State 23
Alamo Bowl: (20) Missouri 30, (23) Northwestern 23 (OT)
NFL News:
Detroit Lions head coach Rod Marinelli is fired following the team's 0–16 season.
Eric Mangini is fired as New York Jets' head coach after his team missed the playoffs.
Romeo Crennel is fired as Cleveland Browns head coach.

Cricket
South Africa in Australia:
2nd Test in Melbourne, day 4:
 394 and 247 (Ricky Ponting 99, Dale Steyn 5/67);  459 and 30/0. South Africa require another 153 runs with 10 wickets remaining.

Ice hockey
World Junior Championships in Ottawa, Ontario, Canada
Group A (at Scotiabank Place):
 1–5 
Group B (at the Ottawa Civic Centre):
 1–10

Football (soccer)
News:
Liverpool midfielder and team captain Steven Gerrard is arrested on charges of assault after being involved in a fight at a pub following a match against Newcastle United.

Winter sports

Alpine skiing
Women's World Cup in Semmering, Austria:
Slalom: (1) Maria Riesch  1 minute 55.97 seconds (2) Tanja Poutiainen  1:56.18 (3) Lindsey Vonn  1:56.69
Overall World Cup standings (after 12 races): (1) Vonn 530 pts (2) Riesch 507 (3) Poutiainen 498

Cross-country skiing
Tour de Ski, stage 3 in Prague, Czech Republic:
1 km sprint freestyle men: (1) Tor Arne Hetland  (2) Vasily Rochev  (3) Jean-Marc Gaillard 
Overall standings: (1) Dario Cologna  45:01.4 (2) Rochev +15.4 (3) Gaillard +18.1
1 km sprint freestyle women: (1) Arianna Follis  (2) Aino-Kaisa Saarinen  (3) Petra Majdič 
Overall standings: (1) Follis 32:23.9 (2) Saarinen +8.0 (3) Marit Bjørgen  +13.1

Ski jumping
Four Hills Tournament:
World Cup in Oberstdorf, Germany:
Individual 137 m hill: (1) Simon Ammann  286.4 pts (136.5/134.0 metres) (2) Wolfgang Loitzl  285.2 (135.0/134.0) (3) Dimitry Vassiliev  284.4 (134.5/136.0)
Overall World Cup standings (after 8 of 28 events): (1) Ammann 685 points (2) Gregor Schlierenzauer  560 (3) Loitzl 439

December 28, 2008 (Sunday)

American football
National Football League Week 17:(Teams that have made playoffs are in boldface)
Carolina Panthers 33, New Orleans Saints 31
The Panthers win the NFC South title and earn a first-round bye in the NFC playoffs.
Houston Texans 31, Chicago Bears 24
The Bears loss knocks them out of the playoffs.
Pittsburgh Steelers 31, Cleveland Browns 0
A pyrrhic victory for the Steelers as Ben Roethlisberger is knocked out of the game with a concussion.
Green Bay Packers 31, Detroit Lions 21
The Lions earn the first 0–16 season in NFL history.
Cincinnati Bengals 16, Kansas City Chiefs 6
New England Patriots 13, Buffalo Bills 0
The Pats win, but are eliminated from the playoffs when the Dolphins and Ravens both win.
Minnesota Vikings 20, New York Giants 19
The Vikings win the NFC North on a Ryan Longwell walk-off 50-yard field goal, and will host Philadelphia next Sunday.
Oakland Raiders 31, Tampa Bay Buccaneers 24
The Bucs are eliminated.
Atlanta Falcons 31, St. Louis Rams 27
The Falcons will play in Glendale next Saturday against the Cardinals.
Indianapolis Colts 23, Tennessee Titans 0
Philadelphia Eagles 44, Dallas Cowboys 6
The Eagles earn the last NFC wild card berth thanks to sloppy play by Dallas, with five turnovers leading to 24 Eagles points.
Baltimore Ravens 27, Jacksonville Jaguars 7
The Ravens clinch the last AFC wild card spot.
Miami Dolphins 24, New York Jets 17
The Dolphins win the AFC East, and will host Baltimore next Sunday.
Arizona Cardinals 34, Seattle Seahawks 21
San Francisco 49ers 27, Washington Redskins 24
San Diego Chargers 52, Denver Broncos 21
The Chargers win the AFC West title and will host the Colts next Saturday in a wild card game.
NCAA Bowl Games:
Independence Bowl: Louisiana Tech 17, Northern Illinois 10

Cricket
South Africa in Australia:
2nd Test in Melbourne, day 3:
 394 and 4/0;  459 (Jean-Paul Duminy 166, Dale Steyn 76, Peter Siddle 4/81). Australia trail by 61 runs with 10 second innings wickets remaining.
Sri Lanka in Bangladesh:
1st Test in Dhaka, day 3:
 293 (Thilan Samaraweera 90) and 291/4 (Mahela Jayawardene 129*);  178. Sri Lanka lead by 406 runs with 6 wickets remaining.
West Indies in New Zealand:
2nd T20I in Hamilton:
 191/9 (Jesse Ryder 62, Brendan McCullum 59, Chris Gayle 2/27);  155/7 (Ramnaresh Sarwan 53, Jeetan Patel 2/12). New Zealand win by 36 runs; two-match series  tied 1–1.

Football (soccer)
ASEAN Championship:
Finals, second leg:
 1–1 , Vietnam win the championship 3–2 on aggregate

Ice hockey
World Junior Championships in Ottawa, Ontario, Canada
Group A (at Scotiabank Place):
 0–15 
 4–3 
Group B (at the Ottawa Civic Centre):
 5–2 
 3–1

Winter sports

Alpine skiing
Men's World Cup in Bormio, Italy:
Downhill: (1) Christof Innerhofer  2:03.55 (2) Klaus Kroll  2:03.87 (3) Michael Walchhofer  2:04.50
Overall World Cup standings (after 14 races): (1) Aksel Lund Svindal  444 pts (2) Benjamin Raich  393 (3) Didier Cuche  379
Women's World Cup in Semmering, Austria:
Giant slalom: (1) Kathrin Zettel  2:10.90 (1:06.30+1:04.60) (2) Manuela Mölgg  2:11.27 (1:06.09+1:05.18) (3) Lara Gut  2:11.45 (1:07.36+1:04.09)
Overall World Cup standings (after 11 races): (1) Lindsey Vonn  470 pts (2) Tanja Poutiainen  418 (3) Maria Riesch  407

Cross-country skiing
Tour de Ski, stage 2 in Oberhof, Germany:
10 km pursuit classic women: (1) Virpi Kuitunen  23 min 56.7 sec, (2) Marit Bjørgen  at 3.9 sec, (3) Aino-Kaisa Saarinen  6.2
Overall standings: (1) Kuitunen 30:23.2, (2) Bjørgen at 2.2 sec, (3) Justyna Kowalczyk  6.2
15 km pursuit classic men: (1) Dario Cologna  43:05.1 (2) Axel Teichmann  at 5.6 (3) Sami Jauhojärvi  26.6
Overall standings: (1) Cologna 43:05.1, (2) Teichmann +4.8 (3) Devon Kershaw  +26.4

Nordic combined
World Cup in Oberhof, Germany:
10 km Gundersen: (1) Anssi Koivuranta  27:22.2 (2nd in ski jump) (2) Todd Lodwick  at 6.9 (3rd) (3) Jason Lamy-Chappuis  14.8 (7th)
Overall standings (after eight of 24 rounds): (1) Koivuranta 543 points (2) Magnus Moan  396 (3) Bill Demong  367

December 27, 2008 (Saturday)

American football
NCAA Bowl Games
Meineke Car Care Bowl: West Virginia 31, North Carolina 30
Mountaineers quarterback Pat White wins his fourth straight bowl game for WVU.
Champs Sports Bowl: Florida State 42, Wisconsin 14
Emerald Bowl: California 24, Miami (FL) 17

Cricket
South Africa in Australia:
2nd Test in Melbourne, day 2:
 394 (Ricky Ponting 101, Michael Clarke 88*, Dale Steyn 5/87);  198/7 (Graeme Smith 62, Peter Siddle 3/24). South Africa trail by 196 runs with three first innings wickets remaining.
Sri Lanka in Bangladesh:
1st Test in Dhaka, day 2:
 293 (Thilan Samaraweera 90, Shakib Al Hasan 5/70);  177/9 (Imrul Kayes 33, Muttiah Muralitharan 5/48). Bangladesh trail by 116 runs with one first innings wicket remaining.

Ice hockey
World Junior Championships in Ottawa, Ontario, Canada
Group A (at Scotiabank Place):
 0–9 
Group B (at the Ottawa Civic Centre):
 7–2

Winter sports

Cross-country skiing
Tour de Ski, stage 1 in Oberhof, Germany:
2.8 km freestyle women: (1) Claudia Nystad  6 minutes 17.2 seconds, (2) Arianna Follis  at 1.1 seconds, (3) Justyna Kowalczyk  2.3, Petra Majdič  same time
3.7 km freestyle men: (1) Axel Teichmann  7:11.8, (2) Dario Cologna  at 8.2 sec, (3) Petter Northug  13.0

Nordic combined
World Cup in Oberhof, Germany:
10 km Gundersen: (1) Magnus Moan  25:22.8 (7th in ski jump) (2) Todd Lowick  at 0.3 (4) (3) Anssi Koivuranta  0.4 (1)
Overall World Cup standings (after 7 out of 24 races): (1) Koivuranta 443 points (2) Moan 351 (3) Björn Kircheisen  339

December 26, 2008 (Friday)

American football
NCAA Bowl Games:
Motor City Bowl: Florida Atlantic 24, Central Michigan 21

Cricket
South Africa in Australia:
2nd Test in Melbourne, day 1:
 206/6 (Ricky Ponting 101, Dale Steyn 2/61).
Sri Lanka in Bangladesh:
1st Test in Dhaka, day 1:
 172/6 (Michael Vandort 44, Shakib Al Hasan 3/43).
West Indies in New Zealand:
1st T20I in Auckland:
 155/7 (Ross Taylor 63, Chris Gayle 2/16);  155/8 (Chris Gayle 67, Daniel Vettori 3/16). West Indies win in a 'Super Over' playoff and lead the two-match series 1–0.

Ice hockey
World Junior Championships in Ottawa, Ontario, Canada
Group A (at Scotiabank Place):
 2–8 
 8–1 
Group B (at the Ottawa Civic Centre):
 1–4 
 1–3

December 25, 2008 (Thursday)

Basketball
NBA Christmas Day Games:
Orlando Magic 88, New Orleans Hornets 68
Chris Paul's streak of 108 consecutive games with a steal was broken.
San Antonio Spurs 91, Phoenix Suns 90
Roger Mason hits a walk-off three-pointer to win the game for the Spurs.
Los Angeles Lakers 92, Boston Celtics 83
The Celtics' 19-game winning streak ends and Lakers coach Phil Jackson becomes the fastest coach to the 1,000-win mark.
Cleveland Cavaliers 93, Washington Wizards 89
Dallas Mavericks 102, Portland Trail Blazers 94

December 24, 2008 (Wednesday)

American football
NCAA Bowl Games:
2008 Hawaii Bowl: Notre Dame 49, Hawaii 21
The Irish break a nine-game bowl losing streak thanks to Jimmy Clausen's 401 yards of passing and five touchdowns.

Football (soccer)
ASEAN Championship:
Finals, first leg:
 1–2

December 23, 2008 (Tuesday)

American football
NCAA Bowl Games:
Poinsettia Bowl: (11) TCU 17, (9) Boise State 16
 The Horned Frogs spoil the Broncos' bid for a perfect season.

Baseball
 News: ESPN reports that free agent first baseman Mark Teixeira has signed an eight-year deal with the New York Yankees for US $180 million, subject to passing a physical.

Cricket
England in India:
2nd Test in Mohali, day 5:
 453 and 251/7 declared (Gautam Gambhir 97, Monty Panesar 1/44);  302 and 64/1 (Ian Bell 24*, Ishant Sharma 1/7). Match drawn, India win the two match series 1–0.
West Indies in New Zealand:
2nd Test in Napier, day 5:
 307 and 375 (Chris Gayle 197, Jeetan Patel 5/110);  371 and 220/5 (Jesse Ryder 59*, Jerome Taylor 2/67). Match drawn, two match series drawn 0–0.

Football (soccer)
Argentine league:
Apertura play-off:
Boca Juniors 0–1 Tigre
Boca wins the championship despite their loss by better goals-difference.

December 22, 2008 (Monday)

American football
National Football League Week 16 Monday Night Football:
Chicago Bears 20, Green Bay Packers 17 (OT)
 The Bears block a potential game-winning field goal attempt by Mason Crosby with 18 seconds left in regulation, and Robbie Gould's 38-yarder in overtime keeps the Bears alive for a playoff berth.

Cricket
England in India:
2nd Test in Mohali, day 4:
 453 (Gautam Gambhir 179) and 134/4 (Gambhir 44*);  302 (Kevin Pietersen 144). India lead by 285 runs with 6 wickets remaining.
West Indies in New Zealand:
2nd Test in Napier, day 4:
 307 (Shivnarine Chanderpaul 126) and 278/7 (Chris Gayle 146*);  371 (Tim McIntosh 136). West Indies lead by 214 runs with 3 wickets remaining.

Winter sports

Alpine skiing
Men's World Cup in Alta Badia, Italy:
Slalom: (1) Ivica Kostelić  1:39.83 (49.26 + 50.57), (2) Jean-Baptiste Grange  1:40.03 (49.79 + 50.24), (3) Benjamin Raich  1:40.63 (49.83 + 50.80)
World Cup overall standings (after 13 races): (1) Aksel Lund Svindal  430pts, (2) Raich 393, (3) Grange 366

December 21, 2008 (Sunday)

American football
National Football League Week 16:(teams in boldface are in the playoffs; teams in italics are eliminated)
New England Patriots 47, Arizona Cardinals 7
Cincinnati Bengals 14, Cleveland Browns 0
Miami Dolphins 38, Kansas City Chiefs 31
The Dolphins keep their playoff hopes alive with a win in Arrowhead Stadium.
New Orleans Saints 42, Detroit Lions 7
The Lions' 15th straight loss sets a new record for futility at the start of a season and clinches the first pick in the 2009 NFL Draft.
Tennessee Titans 31, Pittsburgh Steelers 14
The Titans clinch home field advantage in the AFC playoffs.
San Diego Chargers 41, Tampa Bay Buccaneers 24
The Chargers stay in contention for the AFC West title.
San Francisco 49ers 17, St. Louis Rams 16
Buffalo Bills 30, Denver Broncos 23
The Broncos' loss and the Chargers win set up a winner-take-all game for the AFC West title next Sunday in San Diego.
Oakland Raiders 27, Houston Texans 16
Seattle Seahawks 13, New York Jets 3
Mike Holmgren wins his last home game as the Seahawks' coach.
Atlanta Falcons 24, Minnesota Vikings 17
The win gives the Falcons a playoff spot.
Washington Redskins 10, Philadelphia Eagles 3
New York Giants 34, Carolina Panthers 28 (OT)
The Giants clinch home-field advantage in the playoffs after a Brandon Jacobs touchdown in overtime.
NCAA Bowl Games:
New Orleans Bowl: Southern Mississippi 31, Troy 28 (OT)

Badminton
Super Series Masters Finals in Kota Kinabalu, Sabah, Malaysia:
Men's singles: Lee Chong Wei  (1) bt Peter Gade  (4) 21–8 21–16
Men's doubles: Koo Kien Keat/Tan Boon Heong  (6) bt Jung Jae-sung/Lee Yong-dae  (3) 21–18 21–14
Women's singles: Zhou Mi  (1) bt Wang Chen  (3) 21–14 21–18
Women's doubles: Chin Eei Hui/Wong Pei Tty  (1) bt Vita Marissa/Liliyana Natsir  (2) 21–15 22–20
Mixed doubles: Thomas Laybourn/Kamilla Rytter Juhl  (2) bt Nova Widianto/Liliyana Natsir  (1) 21–19 18–21 22–20

Cricket
South Africa in Australia:
1st Test in Perth, day 5:
 375 and 319;  281 and 414/4 (Graeme Smith 108, AB de Villiers 106*, Mitchell Johnson 3/98). South Africa win by six wickets and lead the 3-match series 1–0.
England in India:
2nd Test in Mohali, day 3:
 453;  282/6. England trail by 171 runs with 4 wickets remaining in the 1st innings.
West Indies in New Zealand:
2nd Test in Napier, day 3:
 307 and 62/2 (Chris Gayle 36*);  371 (Tim McIntosh 136, Fidel Edwards 7/87). West Indies trail by two runs with eight second innings wickets remaining.

Football (soccer)
FIFA Club World Cup in Japan:
Match for third place:
Pachuca  0–1  Gamba Osaka
Final:
LDU Quito  0–1  Manchester United
Wayne Rooney scores for United in the 73rd minute.
ASEAN Championship:(first leg result in parentheses)
Semifinals, second leg:
 0(0)–1(0)

Golf
European Tour:
South African Open Championship in Paarl, South Africa:
Winner:  Richard Sterne 274 (−14)PO
Men's unofficial events:
Chevron World Challenge in Thousand Oaks, California:
 Vijay Singh wins.

Snooker
UK Championship in Telford, United Kingdom:
Final:  Shaun Murphy def.  Marco Fu 10–9

Winter sports

Alpine skiing
Women's World Cup in St. Moritz, Switzerland:
Downhill: cancelled
Men's World Cup in Alta Badia, Italy:
Giant slalom: (1) Daniel Albrecht  2:32.71 (1:15.33 + 1:17.38) (2) Ivica Kostelić  2:32.83 (1:16.62 + 1:16.21) (3) Hannes Reichelt  2:33.04 (1:16.79 + 1:16.25)
Overall standings (after 12 races): (1) Aksel Lund Svindal  430 (2) Didier Cuche  334 (3) Benjamin Raich  333

Biathlon
World Cup 3 in Hochfilzen, Austria:
Men's 4 x 7.5 km relay: (1)  1:21:23.18 0+1 0+4 (2)  1:22:34.33 +1:11.2 0+3 1+9 (3)  1:22:39.44 +1:16.3 0+2 0+3
Women's 4 x 6 km relay: (1)  1 hr 14 min 00.3 sec, (2)  at 1:43.4, (3)  2:13.8

Bobsleigh
World Cup 4 in Cesana Pariol, Italy: cancelled

Cross-country skiing
World Cup in Düsseldorf, Germany:
Team sprint freestyle men: (1)  17:37.0 (2)  17:37.0 (3)  17:37.7
Team sprint freestyle women: (1)  9:35.5 (2)  9:35.7 (3)  9:37.3

Nordic combined
World Cup in Ramsau am Dachstein, Austria:
10 km Gundersen: (1) Björn Kircheisen  23:43.3 (10th after ski jump leg) (2) Bill Demong  at 0.3 (7) (3) Jason Lamy-Chappuis  0.5 (9)
Overall World Cup standings (after six of 24 events): (1) Anssi Koivuranta  383 points (2) Kircheisen 299 (3) Demong 290

Skeleton
World Cup 4 in Cesana Pariol, Italy: cancelled

Ski jumping
World Cup in Engelberg, Switzerland:
Individual 137 m hill: (1) Gregor Schlierenzauer  264.1 pts (133.5 m + 133.5 m) (2) Wolfgang Loitzl  262.4 (132.5+133.0) (3) Simon Amman  260.0 (131.5+136.0)
Overall World Cup standings (after seven of 28 events): (1) Amman 585 (2) Schlierenzauer 510 (3) Loitzl 359

Snowboarding
World Cup in Arosa, Switzerland:
Parallel slalom men: (1) Siegfried Grabner  (2) Roland Fischnaller  (3) Zan Kosir 
Parallel slalom women: (1) Heidi Neururer  (2) Michelle Gorgone  (3) Isabella Laboeck

December 20, 2008 (Saturday)

American football
National Football League Week 16 Saturday Night Football:
Baltimore Ravens 33, Dallas Cowboys 24
A celebration of the last game played at Texas Stadium is ruined by two late touchdown runs by Willis McGahee (77 yards) and Le'Ron McClain (82 yards) for the Ravens.
College football:
NCAA Bowl Games:
EagleBank Bowl: Wake Forest 29, Navy 19
New Mexico Bowl: Colorado State 40, Fresno State 35
St. Petersburg Bowl: South Florida 41, Memphis 14
Las Vegas Bowl: Arizona 31, (16) Brigham Young 21
NCAA Division III Final at Salem, Virginia:
Mount Union 31, Wisconsin-Whitewater 26
 The Purple Raiders win for the third time in four consecutive D-III finals against the Warhawks, taking a 21–7 lead in the first quarter and never looking back. Mount Union's Nate Kmic becomes the first player in NCAA history to rush for over 8,000 yards in his career.

Cricket
South Africa in Australia:
1st Test in Perth, day 4:
 375 and 319;  281 and 227/3. South Africa require another 187 runs with 7 wickets remaining.
England in India:
2nd Test in Mohali, day 2:
 453 (Gautam Gambhir 179, Rahul Dravid 136)
West Indies in New Zealand:
2nd Test in Napier, day 2:
 307 (Shivnarine Chanderpaul 126*, Iain O'Brien 6/75);  145/2 (Tim McIntosh 62*, Fidel Edwards 2/26). New Zealand trail by 162 runs with 8 wickets remaining in the first innings.
Fidel Edwards took his 100th Test wicket when he dismissed Daniel Flynn in New Zealand's first innings.

Football (soccer)
ASEAN Championship:(first leg result in parentheses)
Semifinals, second leg:
 2(1)–1(0) 
Argentine league:
Apertura play-off:
Boca Juniors 3–1 San Lorenzo
A goal by Cristian Manuel Chávez in injury time for Boca means they can lose to Tigre by one goal margin on Tuesday and still win the championship.

Volleyball

Penn State wins their second consecutive NCAA women's championship, defeating Stanford 3–0. The Nittany Lions finish the season 38–0, only losing two sets total.

Winter sports

Alpine skiing
Men's World Cup in Val Gardena, Italy:
Downhill: (1) Michael Walchhofer  1:50.57 (2) Bode Miller  1:50.95 (3) Manuel Osborne-Paradis  1:51.11
Overall World Cup standings (after 11 races): (1) Aksel Lund Svindal  398 pts (2) Carlo Janka  315 (3) Benjamin Raich  297
Women's World Cup in St. Moritz, Switzerland:
Super giant slalom: (1) Lara Gut  57.38 (2) Fabienne Suter  58.01 (3) Nadia Fanchini  58.25
Overall World Cup standings (after 10 races): (1) Lindsey Vonn  438 pts (2) Tanja Poutiainen  400 (3) Maria Riesch  378

Biathlon
World Cup 3 in Hochfilzen, Austria:
Men's 10 km sprint: (1) Lars Berger  25:23.1 0 penalty (2) Alexander Os  at 37.9 1 (3) Dmitri Yaroshenko  39.8 0
Overall World Cup standings (after seven races): (1) Emil Hegle Svendsen  299 points (2) Tomasz Sikora  289 (3) Michael Greis  281
Women's 7.5 km sprint: (1) Svetlana Sleptsova  23 min 21.8 sec 1 penalty (2) Ekaterina Iourieva  at 2.7 s 0 (3) Vita Semerenko  16.6 0
Overall World Cup standings (after seven events): (1) Sleptsova 327 points (2) Martina Beck  278 (3) Iourieva 277

Bobsleigh
World Cup 4 in Cesana Pariol, Italy: cancelled

Cross-country skiing
World Cup in Düsseldorf, Germany:
1.6 km sprint freestyle men: (1) Ola Vigen Hattestad  (2) Tor Arne Hetland  (3) Fabio Pasini 
Overall standings (after seven out of 33 races): (1) Hattestad 300 points (2) Dario Cologna  208 (3) Hetland 191
0.8 km sprint freestyle women: (1) Petra Majdič  (2) Natalia Matveeva  (3) Maiken Caspersen Falla 
Overall standings (after seven out of 33 races): (1) Aino-Kaisa Saarinen  397 points (2) Majdic 389 (3) Marit Bjørgen  280

Freestyle skiing
World Cup in Adventure Mountain, China:
Aerials men: (1) Alexei Grishin  249.25 (2) Li Ke  244.52 (3) Warren Shouldice  238.90
Aerials women: (1) Zhao Shanshan  201.63 (2) Li Nina  192.81 (3) Lydia Lassila  179.06

Nordic combined
World Cup in Ramsau am Dachstein, Austria:
10 km Gundersen: (1) Bill Demong  25:59.4 (2nd after ski-jump leg) (2) Björn Kircheisen  at 28.3 (6) (3) Jan Schmid  37.3 (8)
Overall World Cup standings (after five out of 24 races): (1) Anssi Koivuranta  333 points (2) Magnus Moan  211 (3) Demong 210

Ski jumping
World Cup in Engelberg, Switzerland:
Individual 137 m hill: (1) Simon Ammann  275.4 points (138.5 m/137.0 m) (2) Wolfgang Loitzl  273.2 (134.0/137.5) (3) Gregor Schlierenzauer  265.7 (135.0/134.0)
World Cup overall standings (after six of 28 events): (1) Ammann 525 points (2) Schlierenzauer 410 (3) Loitzl 279

Snowboarding
World Cup in Arosa, Switzerland:
Snowboardcross men: (1) Seth Wescott  (2) Markus Schairer  (3) David Speiser 
Snowboardcross women: (1) Sandra Frei  (2) Helene Olafsen  (3) Nelly Moenne Loccoz

December 19, 2008 (Friday)

American college football
NCAA Division I FCS Final in Chattanooga, Tennessee:
Richmond 24, Montana 7
The Spiders win their school's first national championship in any sport.

Cricket
South Africa in Australia:
1st Test in Perth, day 3:
 375 and 228/7 (Brad Haddin 39*, Jacques Kallis 2/19);  281 (Jacques Kallis 63, Mitchell Johnson 8/61). Australia lead by 322 runs with 3 second innings wickets remaining.
England in India:
2nd Test in Mohali, day 1:
 179/1 (Gautam Gambhir 106*, Stuart Broad 1/45).
West Indies in New Zealand:
2nd Test in Napier, day 1:
 258/6 (Shivnarine Chanderpaul 100*, Daniel Vettori 2/58).

Winter sports

Alpine skiing
Men's World Cup in Val Gardena, Italy:
Super giant slalom: (1) Werner Heel  1:35.04 (2) Didier Défago  1:35.47 (3) Patrik Järbyn  1:35.49
Overall World Cup standings (10 events): (1) Aksel Lund Svindal  398 pts (2) Carlo Janka  315 (3) Benjamin Raich  297
Women's World Cup in St. Moritz, Switzerland:
Combined: (1) Anja Pärson  1:41.87 (57.84 + 44.03) (2) Nicole Hosp  1:42.99 (59.07 + 43.92) (3) Fabienne Suter  1:43.47 (58.35 + 45.12)
Overall World Cup standings (9 events): (1) Lindsey Vonn  438 (2) Tanja Poutiainen  400 (3) Maria Riesch  378

Freestyle skiing
World Cup in Adventure Mountain, China:
Aerials women: (1) Lydia Lassila  92.88 (2) Jacqui Cooper  89.14 (3) Veronika Bauer  88.83
Aerials men: cancelled

Skeleton
World Cup 4 in Cesana Pariol, Italy: cancelled

December 18, 2008 (Thursday)

American football
National Football League Week 16 Thursday Night Football:
Indianapolis Colts 31, Jacksonville Jaguars 24.
The Colts will be the fifth seed in the AFC playoffs with this win.

Basketball
Euroleague, week 8:(teams in bold advance to the Top 16; teams with strike are eliminated)
Group A:
Le Mans  73–87  Maccabi Tel Aviv
Maccabi punch their ticket to the Top 16.
Unicaja Málaga  72–68  Air Avellino
Málaga's win secures them, as well as  Cibona, a Top 16 berth and eliminates Avellino.
Group B:
Žalgiris Kaunas  79–68  Asseco Prokom Sopot
Žalgiris stay alive in the Top 16 race, taking the tiebreaker from Prokom.
Group C:
ALBA Berlin  68–73  TAU Cerámica
TAU also punch their Top 16 ticket.
Lottomatica Roma  74–69  Union Olimpija Ljubljana (OT)
Roma advance to the Top 16, while Ljubljana are eliminated.
Group D:
Panionios  64–78  Efes Pilsen

Cricket
South Africa in Australia:
1st Test in Perth, day 2:
 375 (Simon Katich 83, Makhaya Ntini 4/72);  243/8 (Jacques Kallis 63, AB de Villiers 63, Mitchell Johnson 7/42). South Africa trail by 132 runs with 2 wickets remaining in the first innings.

Football (soccer)
FIFA Club World Cup in Japan:
Semifinal 2:
Gamba Osaka  3–5  Manchester United
Match for fifth place:
Al Ahly  0–1  Adelaide United
UEFA Cup group stage, matchday 5:(teams in bold advance to the last-32 round; teams with strike are eliminated)
Group A:
Paris Saint-Germain  4–0  Twente
Racing Santander  3–1  Manchester City
Idle: Schalke 04
Final standings: Man City 7 points, Twente 6, PSG 5, Racing 5, Schalke 4
Group B:
Olympiacos  4–0  Hertha BSC
Benfica  0–1  Metalist Kharkiv
Idle: Galatasaray
Final standings: Metalist 10 points, Galatasaray 9, Olympiacos 6, Hertha 2, Benfica 1
Group C:
Sampdoria  1–0  Sevilla
Stuttgart  3–0  Standard Liège
Idle: Partizan Belgrade
Final standings: Standard 9 points, Stuttgart 7, Sampdoria 7, Sevilla 6, Partizan 0
Group D:
NEC  2–0  Udinese
Tottenham Hotspur  2–2  Spartak Moscow
Idle: Dinamo Zagreb
Final standings: Udinese 9 points, Spurs 7, NEC 6, Spartak 4, Dinamo 3

Winter sports

Biathlon
World Cup 3 in Hochfilzen, Austria:
Men's 20 km individual: (1) Maxim Tchoudov  56 mins 00.3 secs (1 penalty) (2) Ivan Tcherezov  at 47.6 (2) (3) Björn Ferry  48.5 (1)
Overall World Cup standings (after six races): (1) Emil Hegle Svendsen  299 points (2) Tomasz Sikora  255 (3) Michael Greis  243
Women's 15 km individual: (1) Albina Akhatova  50 mins 03.0 secs (0 penalties) (2) Éva Tófalvi  at 17.5 (0) (3) Svetlana Sleptsova  49.9 (2)
Overall World Cup standings (after six races): (1) Sleptsova 267 points (2) Martina Beck  251 (3) Ekaterina Iourieva  223

Freestyle skiing
World Cup in Meribel, France:
Moguls men: (1) Pierre-Alexandre Rousseau  (2) Alexandre Bilodeau  (3) Anthony Benna 
Moguls women: (1) Hannah Kearney  (2) Jennifer Heil  (3) Nikola Sudova

December 17, 2008 (Wednesday)

Basketball
Euroleague, week 8:(teams in bold advance to the Top 16; teams with strike are eliminated)
Group A:
Olympiacos  93–64  Cibona Zagreb
Group B:
Regal FC Barcelona  87–61  Montepaschi Siena
Barcelona improve to a league-best 7–1 record.
Panathinaikos Athens  83–69  SLUC Nancy
Panathinaikos secure their place in the Top 16.
Group C:
Fenerbahçe Ülker  89–63  DKV Joventut
Group D:
CSKA Moscow  78–82  Real Madrid
AJ Milano  73–59  Partizan Belgrade

Cricket
South Africa in Australia:
1st Test in Perth, day 1:
 341/9 (Simon Katich 83)

Football (soccer)
FIFA Club World Cup in Japan:
Semifinal 1:
Pachuca  0–2  LDU Quito
UEFA Cup group stage, matchday 5:(teams in bold advance to the last-32 round; teams with strike are eliminated)
Group E:
Portsmouth  3–0  Heerenveen
Milan  2–2  Wolfsburg
Idle: Braga
Final standings: Wolfsburg 10 pts, Milan 8, Braga 6, Portsmouth 4, Heerenveen 0.
Group F:
Hamburg  3–1  Aston Villa
Ajax  2–2  Slavia Prague
Idle: Žilina
Final standings: Hamburg 9 pts, Ajax 7, Aston Villa 6, Žilina 4, Slavia Prague 2.
Group G:
Club Brugge  0–1  Copenhagen
Saint-Étienne  2–2  Valencia
Idle: Rosenborg
Final standings: St. Étienne 8 pts, Valencia 6, Copenhagen 5, Brugge 3, Rosenborg 2.
Group H:
Deportivo  1–0  Nancy
Feyenoord  0–1  Lech Poznań
Idle: CSKA Moscow
Final standings: CSKA 12 pts, Deportivo 7, Poznań 5, Nancy 4, Feyenoord 0.
ASEAN Championship:
Semifinals, first leg:
 0–0 
Argentine league:
Apertura play off:
San Lorenzo 2–1 Tigre

December 16, 2008 (Tuesday)

Football (soccer)
ASEAN Championship:
Semifinals, first leg:
 0–1

December 15, 2008 (Monday)

American football
 National Football League Week 15 Monday Night Football:
 Philadelphia Eagles 30, Cleveland Browns 10
 The Arena Football League votes to suspend operations, cancelling its 2009 season.

Basketball
NBA:
With their 100–91 win over the Utah Jazz, the Boston Celtics become the third team in NBA history to win 23 of its first 25 games.
The Sacramento Kings fire Reggie Theus, making him the sixth head coach to be fired this season. Assistant Kenny Natt is named his interim replacement.

Cricket
England in India:
1st Test in Chennai, day 5:
 316 and 311/9 dec;  241 and 387/4 (Sachin Tendulkar 103*). India win by 6 wickets.
West Indies in New Zealand:
1st Test in Dunedin, day 5:
Play abandoned due to rain.  365 and 44/2;  340. Match drawn.

December 14, 2008 (Sunday)

American football
National Football League Week 15:(teams in bold clinched a playoff berth; teams in italics are eliminated)
New York Jets 31, Buffalo Bills 27
The Bills are eliminated from playoff contention.
Indianapolis Colts 31, Detroit Lions 21
The Lions drop to 0–14, the third team ever to lose the first 14 games of a season (1976 Buccaneers, 1980 Saints).
Jacksonville Jaguars 20, Green Bay Packers 16
The Packers are eliminated with the loss.
San Diego Chargers 22, Kansas City Chiefs 21
Miami Dolphins 14, San Francisco 49ers 9
Seattle Seahawks 23, St. Louis Rams 20
Atlanta Falcons 13, Tampa Bay Buccaneers 10 (OT)
Atlanta's win eliminated the New Orleans Saints from playoff contention.
Houston Texans 13, Tennessee Titans 12
The Texans' win prevents Tennessee from getting home-field advantage throughout the AFC playoffs for this week.
Cincinnati Bengals 20, Washington Redskins 13
Minnesota Vikings 35, Arizona Cardinals 14
Carolina Panthers 30, Denver Broncos 10
New England Patriots 49, Oakland Raiders 26
Pittsburgh Steelers 13, Baltimore Ravens 9
The win gives the Steelers the AFC North title and a first-round playoff bye, and sets up a showdown with the Titans for AFC playoff home field advantage next Sunday.
Dallas Cowboys 20, New York Giants 8
The Giants loss now sets up a showdown with Carolina for home field advantage in the NFC playoffs next week.

Cricket
England in India:
1st Test in Chennai, day 4:
 316 and 311/9 dec (Andrew Strauss 108, Paul Collingwood 108, Zaheer Khan 3/40);  241 and 131/1 (Virender Sehwag 83). India need 256 runs to win with nine wickets in hand.
West Indies in New Zealand:
1st Test in Dunedin, day 4:
 365 and 44/2 (Tim McIntosh 24*, Daren Powell 2/17);  340 (Jerome Taylor 106, Daniel Vettori 6/56). New Zealand lead by 69 runs with 8 second innings wickets remaining.

Football (soccer)
FIFA Club World Cup in Japan:
Quarterfinal 2:
Adelaide United  0–1  Gamba Osaka
Gamba Osaka will play Manchester United  in the semifinals.
Caribbean Championship in Jamaica:
Third Place Playoff:
 0–0 
Guadeloupe wins 5–4 in penalty shootout.
Final:
 0–2 
Luton Shelton scores twice from the penalty spot for The Reggae Boyz.
Argentine league:
The Apertura ends with 3-way tie between San Lorenzo, Tigre and Boca Juniors, that requires a triangular play-off series, beginning on Wednesday.

Golf
European Tour:
Alfred Dunhill Championship in Mpumalanga, South Africa
Winner: Richard Sterne  271 (−17)
Men's unofficial events:
Merrill Lynch Shootout in Naples, Florida:
Winners: Kenny Perry  & Scott Hoch

Gymnastics
Artistic Gymnastics World Cup Final in Madrid, Spain:
Men:
Vault: (1) Thomas Bouhail  16.225 (2) Jeffrey Wammes  16.150 (3) Anton Golotsutskov  16.075 (3) Isaak Botella Perez  16.075
Parallel bars: (1) Yann Cucherat  15.775 (1) Feng Zhe  15.775 (3) Valeriy Goncharov  15.675
Horizontal bars: (1) Epke Zonderland  16.175 (2) Philippe Rizzo  15.825 (3) Hiroyuki Tomita  15.325
Women:
Beam: (1) Lauren Mitchell  15.250 (2) Yulia Lozhechko  15.200 (3) Li Shanshan  15.150
Floor: (1) Cheng Fei 15.375 (2) Jiang Yuyan  15.225 (3) Sandra Izbaşa  15.000

Handball
European Women's Championship in Macedonia:
Bronze match:
 21–24 
Final:
 21–34 
Norway wins the European title for the third successive time.

Rugby union
Heineken Cup Pool stage, week 4:
Pool 2:
London Wasps  19–11  Edinburgh Rugby
Pool 3:
Perpignan  26–20  Leicester Tigers
 Dan Carter, on his half-season "sabbatical" from the All Blacks, makes a successful Northern Hemisphere club debut, scoring 16 points to lead Perpignan to the win.
Pool 5:
Glasgow Warriors  19–25  Bath

Swimming
European Short Course Championships in Rijeka, Croatia:
Women:
400 m individual medley: (1) Mireia Belmonte García  4:25.06 (WR) (2) Alessia Filippi  4:26.06 (3) Francesca Segat  4:27.12
200 m freestyle: (1) Federica Pellegrini  1:51.85 (WR) (2) Femke Heemskerk  1:53.79 (3) Daria Belyakina  1:53.85
100 m breaststroke: (1) Valentina Artemyeva  1:05.02 (2) Sophie de Ronchi  1:05.43 (3) Mirna Jukić  1:05.64
100 m butterfly: (1) Jeanette Ottesen  56.70 CR (2) Diane Bui Duyet  56.83 (3) Eszter Dara  56.88
200 m backstroke: (1) Alexandra Putra  2:02.48 (2) Alexianne Castel  2:03.10 (3) Elizabeth Simmonds  2:03.12
50 m freestyle: (1) Marleen Veldhuis  23.55 CR (2) Hinkelien Schreuder  23.72 (3) Jeanette Ottesen  24.05
Men:
200 m breaststroke: (1) Hugues Duboscq  2:04.59 (European Record) (2) Edoardo Giorgetti  2:04.98 (3) Igor Borysik  2:05.47
100 m individual medley: (1) Peter Mankoč  51.97 (European Record) (2) Christian Galenda  52.29 (3) James Goddard  52.36
200 m freestyle: (1) Danila Izotov  1:43.09 (2) Dominik Meichtry  1:43.11 (3) Massimiliano Rosolino  1:43.52
100 m backstroke: (1) Stanislav Donets  49.32 (WR) (2) Aschwin Wildeboer  49.61 (3) Helge Meeuw  50.89
50 m butterfly: (1) Amaury Leveaux  22.23 (2) Milorad Čavić  22.36 (3) Rafael Muñoz  22.46
4x50 m freestyle: (1)  (Alain Bernard, Fabien Gilot, Amaury Leveaux, Frédérick Bousquet) 1:20.77 (WR) (2)  (Alessandro Calvi, Marco Orsi, Mattia Nalesso, Filippo Magnini) 1:23.37 (3)  (Duje Draganja, Alexei Puninski, Bruno Barbic, Mario Todorovic) 1:23.68

Winter sports

Alpine skiing
Men's World Cup in Val-d'Isère, France:
Slalom: cancelled
Women's World Cup in La Molina, Spain:
Slalom: (1) Maria Riesch  1:52.98 (2) Lindsey Vonn  1:54.46 (3) Kathrin Zettel  1:55.34
Overall World Cup standings: (1) Vonn 438 (2) Tanja Poutiainen  400 (3) Riesch 328

Biathlon
World Cup 2 in Hochfilzen, Austria:(shooting penalties in brackets)
Men's 4 x 7.5 km relay: (1)  (Nikolay Kruglov, Ivan Tcherezov, Maxim Maksimov, Maxim Tchoudov) 1 hr 24 min 22.9 sec (1), (2)  at 1 min 48.1 sec (2), (3)  2:38.6 (3)
Women's 4 x 6 km relay: (1)  (Svetlana Sleptsova, Olga Medvedtseva, Ekaterina Iourieva, Albina Akhatova) 1:10:49.58 (6) (2)  1:12:44.35 +1:54.8 (9) (3)  1:12:46.41 +1:56.9 (9)

Bobsleigh
World Cup 3 in Igls, Austria:
Four-man: (1)  (Alexandr Zubkov, Roman Oreshnikov, Dmitry Trunenkov, Dmitriy Stepushkin) 1:42.34 (2)  (Steven Holcomb, Justin Olsen, Steve Mesler, Curtis Tomasevicz) 1:42.48 (3)  (Dmitry Abramovitch, Philippe Egorov, Andrey Jurkov, Petr Moiseev) 1:42.54
World Cup standings: (1) Zubkov 645 (2) André Lange  603 (3) Holcomb 578

Cross-country skiing
World Cup in Davos, Switzerland:
Sprint freestyle women: (1) Petra Majdič  (2) Celine Brun-Lie  (3) Marit Bjørgen 
Overall World Cup standings: (1) Aino-Kaisa Saarinen  397 (2) Majdic 289 (3) Bjoergen 280
Sprint freestyle men: (1) Ola Vigen Hattestad  (2) Johan Kjoelstad  (3) Renato Pasini 
Overall World Cup standings: (1) Dario Alonzo Cologna  208 (2) Hattestad 200 (3) Johan Olsson  186

Luge
World Cup 3 in Winterberg, Germany:
Women: (1) Natalie Geisenberger  (2) Tatjana Hüfner  (3) Anke Wischnewski 
World Cup standings: (1) Hüfner 285 (2) Geisenberger 245 (3) Wischnewski 210

Ski jumping
World Cup in Pragelato, Italy:
Individual 140 m hill: (1) Fumihisa Yumoto  114.8 pts (126.0 m) (2) Simon Ammann  113.6 (124.5) (3) Johan Remen Evensen  110.3 (123.5)
World Cup standings (after five events): (1) Ammann 425 (2) Gregor Schlierenzauer  350 (3) Ville Larinto  205

Snowboarding
World Cup in Limone Piemonte, Italy:
Men's parallel GS: (1) Matthew Morison  (2) Sylvain Dufour  (3) Jasey Jay Anderson 
Women's parallel GS: (1) Doris Guenther  (2) Kimiko Zakreski  (3) Anke Karstens

Speed skating
World Cup 5 in Nagano, Japan:
500 m women:
500 m men:
1000 m women:
1000 m men:
100 m women:
100 m men:

December 13, 2008 (Saturday)

American college football

 2008 Heisman Trophy:
 With three underclassman quarterbacks as the finalists, Oklahoma's Sam Bradford becomes the second sophomore to win the prestigious award.  Last year's winner, Tim Tebow of Florida, had the most first place votes, but lost four of the six regions to Bradford and finished third in total votes behind runnerup Colt McCoy of Texas.
 NCAA Division I FCS semifinal at Cedar Falls, Iowa:
 Richmond 21, Northern Iowa 20
 Trailing 20–7 in the fourth quarter, the Spiders come back to score the winning touchdown and extra point with 14 seconds remaining.
 NCAA Division II Championship at Florence, Alabama:
 Minnesota-Duluth 21, Northwest Missouri State 14
 The Bulldogs win their first national title in football, while the Bearcats lose in the title game for the fourth straight year, with each loss being by a touchdown or less.

Basketball
 National Basketball Association news: The Philadelphia 76ers become the league's fifth team to fire their head coach this season, axing Maurice Cheeks after a 9–14 start, even though the Sixers had extended his contract twice in the past year. Assistant general manager Tony DiLeo will be Cheeks' interim replacement.

Cricket
England in India:
1st Test in Chennai, day 3:
 316 and 172/3 (Andrew Strauss 73*);  241 (MS Dhoni 53). England lead by 247 runs with 7 wickets remaining.
West Indies in New Zealand:
1st Test in Dunedin, day 3:
 365 (Daniel Flynn 95, Chris Gayle 3/42);  39/0 (Chris Gayle 29*). West Indies trail by 326 runs with 10 wickets remaining in the 1st innings.

Football (soccer)
FIFA Club World Cup in Japan:
Quarterfinal 1:
Al Ahly  2–4(AET)  Pachuca
Pachuca comes back from 0–2 down to win in extra-time, and will meet LDU Quito in the semifinals.

Gymnastics
Artistic Gymnastics World Cup Final in Madrid, Spain:
Men:
Floor: (1) Diego Hypólito  16.125 (2) Kōhei Uchimura  15.900 (3) Alexander Shatilov  15.500
Pommel horse: (1) Zhang Hongtao  16.375 (2) Krisztián Berki  16.100 (3) Prashanth Sellathurai  16.025
Rings: (1) Olexander Vorobyov  16.275 (2) Yordan Yovchev  16.150 (3) Yuri van Gelder  16.075
Women:
Vault: (1) Cheng Fei  15.050 (2) Ariella Kaeslin  14.912 (3) Aagje Vanwalleghem  14.425
Uneven bars: (1) He Kexin  16.250 (2) Jiang Yuyan  15.700 (3) Koko Tsurumi  15.250

Handball
European Women's Championship in Macedonia
5th/6th placement match:
 36–33(OT) 
Semifinals:
 32–29 
 24–18

Rugby union
Heineken Cup Pool stage, week 4:
Pool 1:
Munster (Ireland) 23–13  Clermont
Montauban  16–12  Sale Sharks
Pool 3:
Benetton Treviso  16–36  Ospreys
Pool 4:
Harlequins  19–17  Stade Français
Pool 5:
Newport Gwent Dragons  13–26  Toulouse
Pool 6:
Biarritz  6–10  Cardiff Blues 13:35
Gloucester  48–5  Calvisano

Swimming
European Short Course Championships in Rijeka, Croatia:
Men:
1500 m freestyle: (1) Federico Colbertaldo  14:24.21 (2) Vitaly Romanovich  14:29.64 (3) Samuel Pizzetti  14:31.60
200 m butterfly: (1) Nikolay Skvortsov  1:50.60 (WR) (2) Dinko Jukić  1:52.31 (3) Maxim Ganikhin  1:52.32
100 m freestyle: (1) Amaury Leveaux  44.94 (WR) (2) Fabien Gilot  45.84 (3) Filippo Magnini  46.62
50 m breaststroke: (1) Matjaž Markič  26.47 CR (2) Aleksander Hetland  26.64 (3) Emil Tahirovič  26.66
Women:
400 m freestyle: (1) Coralie Balmy  3:56.39 (2) Camille Muffat  3:57.48 (3) Alessia Filippi  3:59.35
100 m individual medley: (1) Hanna-Maria Seppälä  59.24 CR (2) Evelyn Verrasztó  59.49 (3) Francesca Segat  59.61
50 m backstroke: (1) Sanja Jovanović  26.23 (WR) (2) Kateryna Zubkova  26.65 (3) Elena Gemo  26.77
4x50 m medley relay: (1)  (Ranomi Kromowidjojo, Moniek Nijhuis, Hinkelien Schreuder, Marleen Veldhuis) 1:45.73 (WR) (2)  (Daniela Samulski, Janne Schaefer, Lena Kalla, Petra Dallmann) 1:46.84 (3)  (Elena Gemo, Roberta Panara, Silvia di Pietro, Federica Pellegrini) 1:47.05

Winter sports

Alpine skiing
Men's World Cup in Val-d'Isère, France:
Giant slalom: (1)  Carlo Janka (2)  Massimiliano Blardone (3)  Gauthier de Tessières
Overall World Cup standings: (1) Aksel Lund Svindal  395 (2) Benjamin Raich  293 (3) Janka 291
Women's World Cup in La Molina, Spain:
Giant slalom: (1)  Tanja Poutiainen (2)   Manuela Mölgg (3)  Nicole Hosp

Biathlon
World Cup 2 in Hochfilzen, Austria:(shooting penalties in brackets)
Men's 12.5 km pursuit: (1) Emil Hegle Svendsen  35 min 46.3 sec (3), (2) Ole Einar Bjørndalen  at 9.4 sec (2), (3) Tomasz Sikora  12 (3)
Overall World Cup standings (after five events): (1) Svendsen 276 pts, (2) Sikora 234, (3) Michael Greis  200
Women's 10 km pursuit: (1) Martina Beck  33 min 41.2 sec (1), (2) Svetlana Sleptsova  at 18.3 (4), (3) Simone Hauswald  19.2 (5)
Overall World Cup standings (after five events): (1) Beck 224 pts, (2) Sleptsova 219, (3) Tora Berger  206

Bobsleigh
World Cup 3 in Igls, Austria:
Two-man: (1) Thomas Florschütz / Marc Kühne  1:44.62 (2) Beat Hefti / Thomas Lamparter  1:44.70 +0.08 (3) Steven Holcomb / Justin Olsen  1:44.75 +0.13
World Cup standings (three races): (1) Hefti 635 (2) André Lange  627 (3) Matthias Höpfner  568

Cross-country skiing
World Cup in Davos, Switzerland:
Women's 10 km classic: (1) Virpi Kuitunen  29 min 51.0 sec, (2) Aino-Kaisa Saarinen  at 18 seconds, (3) Marit Bjørgen  46.7
Overall World Cup standings (after five of 33 events): (1) Saarinen 365 pts, (2) Kuitunen 269, (3) Justyna Kowalczyk  227
Men's 15 km classic: (1) Johan Olsson  40:10.0 (2) Axel Teichmann  40:20.5 +10.50 (3) Sami Jauhojärvi   40:38.5 +28.50

Curling
European Championships in Örnsköldsvik, Sweden:(All times CET)
Men:
Final:  6–7 
David Murdoch's team repeats its win over Thomas Ulsrud last year.
World challenge 2:  6–1 
World challenge 3:  5–7 
Finland qualify to 2009 World Championship.
Women:
Final:  5–4 
Mirjam Ott wins her second European title and denies Anette Norberg her 8th championship.
World challenge 2:  7–4 
World challenge 3:  9–10 
Norway qualify to 2009 World Championship.

Figure skating
Grand Prix:
Grand Prix Final and Junior Grand Prix Final in Goyang, South Korea:
Junior ice dance:
(1) Madison Chock / Greg Zuerlein  131.15 (2) Madison Hubbell / Keiffer Hubbell  124.68 (3) Ekaterina Riazanova / Jonathan Guerreiro  124.30
Junior ladies:
(1) Becky Bereswill  146.69 (2) Yukiko Fujisawa  145.92 (3) Alexe Gilles  144.49
Senior ice dance:
Final standings (free dance in brackets): (1) Isabelle Delobel/Olivier Schoenfelder  156.10 (95.75) (2) Oksana Domnina/Maxim Shabalin  152.95 (93.62) (3) Meryl Davis/Charlie White  148.04 (92.15)
Senior men:
Final standings (free skating in brackets): (1) Jeremy Abbott  237.72 (159.46) (2) Takahiko Kozuka  224.63 (140.73) (3) Johnny Weir  215.50 (143.00)
Senior ladies:
Final standings (free skating in brackets): (1) Mao Asada  188.55 (123.17) (2) Kim Yuna  186.35 (120.41) (3) Carolina Kostner  168.01 (112.13)
Senior pairs:
Final standings (free skating in brackets): (1) Pang Qing/Tong Jian  191.49 (125.25) (2) Zhang Dan/Zhang Hao  188.22 (119.88) (3) Aliona Savchenko/Robin Szolkowy  185.09 (114.95)

Luge
World Cup 3 in Winterberg, Germany:
Men: (1) Armin Zöggeler  (2) David Möller  (3) Johannes Ludwig 
World Cup standings: (1) Zöggeler 255 (2) Möller 240 (3) Andi Langenhan  180
Doubles: (1) Christian Oberstolz / Patrick Gruber  (2) Markus Schiegl / Tobias Schiegl  (3) Patric Leitner / Alexander Resch 
World Cup standings: (1) Oberstolz/Gruber 260 (2) Andreas Linger/Wolfgang Linger  220 (3) Schiegl/Schiegl 201

Skeleton
World Cup 3 in Igls, Austria:
Men: (1) Frank Rommel  1:46.01 (2) Aleksandr Tretyakov  1:46.26 +0.25 (3) Martins Dukurs  1:46.38 +0.37
World Cup standings: (1) Dukurs 610 (2) Florian Grassl  593 (3) Tretyakov 572

Ski jumping
World Cup in Pragelato, Italy:
Individual 140 m hill: (1) Simon Ammann  284.3 points (139.5/144.0 m) (2) Gregor Schlierenzauer  282.6 (137.5/139.5 m) (3) Ville Larinto  259.2 (131.5/135.0 m)
World Cup standings (after four of 28 events): (1) Ammann 345 points (2) Schlierenzauer 300 (3) Larinto 205

Speed skating
World Cup 5 in Nagano, Japan:
500 m women:
500 m men:
1000 m women:
1000 m men:

December 12, 2008 (Friday)

American college football
NCAA Division I FCS semifinal at Harrisonburg, Virginia:
 Montana 35, James Madison 27
 The top-ranked FCS team is upset at home.

Cricket
England in India:
1st Test in Chennai, day 2:
 316;  155/6. India trail by 161 runs with 4 wickets remaining in the 1st innings.
West Indies in New Zealand:
1st Test in Dunedin, day 2:
No play due to rain.

Rugby union
Heineken Cup Pool stage, week 4:
Pool 2:
Castres  18–15 (Ireland) Leinster
Pool 4:
Scarlets  16–16 (Ireland) Ulster

Swimming
European Short Course Championships in Rijeka, Croatia:
Women:
800 m freestyle: (1) Alessia Filippi  8:04.53 (WR) (2) Coralie Balmy  8:05.32 (3) Lotte Friis  8:09.91
200 m breaststroke: (1) Alena Alekseeva  2:19.93 (2) Mirna Jukić  2:20.48 (3) Patrizia Humplik  2:21.68
100 m freestyle: (1) Marleen Veldhuis  51.95 (2) Jeanette Ottesen  52.08 (3) Ranomi Kromowidjojo  52.22
100 m backstroke: (1) Sanja Jovanovic  58.87 (2) Kateryna Zubkova  57.01 (3) Laure Manaudou  57.16
50 m butterfly: (1) Hinkelien Schreuder  25.21 (2) Jeanette Ottesen  25.54 (3) Diane Bui Duyet  25.55
4X50 m freestyle relay: (1)  1:33.80 (Hinkelien Schreuder, Inge Dekker, Ranomi Kromowidjojo, Marleen Veldhuis) (2)  1:38.00 (Petra Granlund, Claire Hedenskog, Sarah Sjöström, Lovisa Ericsson) (3)  1:38.06 (Dorothea Brandt, Petra Dallmann, Lisa Vitting, Daniela Schreiber)
Men:
400 m medley: (1) Dinko Jukić  4:03.01 (2) Gergő Kis  4:03.81 (3) Lukasz Wojt  4:05.13
100 m breaststroke: (1) Igor Borysik  57.33 (2) Hugues Duboscq  57.64 (3) James Gibson  57.91
100 m butterfly: (1) Milorad Čavić  49.19 (European record) (2) Rafael Muñoz Pérez  49.74 (3) Nikolay Skvortsov  49.98
50 m backstroke: (1) Stanislas Donets  23.22 (2) Aschwin Wildeboer  23.28 (3) Ľuboš Križko  23.47

Winter sports

Alpine skiing
Men's World Cup in Val-d'Isère, France:
Super combined: (1) Benjamin Raich  2:02.48 (2) Jean-Baptiste Grange  2:02.82 (3) Marcel Hirscher  2:03.17
Overall World Cup standings (8 events): (1) Aksel Lund Svindal  345 pts (2) Raich 293 (3) Grange 231

Biathlon
World Cup 2 in Hochfilzen, Austria:
Men's 10 km sprint: (1) Emil Hegle Svendsen  26 min08.1 sec (0 penalty) (2) Ivan Scherezov  at 26.3 (1) (3) Alexander Os  32.9 (2)
Overall World Cup standings (4 races): (1) Svendsen 216 points (2) Tomasz Sikora  186 (3) Michael Greis  164
Women's 7.5 km sprint: (1) Simone Hauswald  23 min 04.3 sec (0 penalty) (2) Svetlana Sleptsova  at 14.1 (2) (3) Andrea Henkel  18.3 (1)
Overall World Cup standings (4 races): (1) Ekaterina Urieva  169 points (2) Tora Berger  166 (3) Sleptsova 165

Bobsleigh
World Cup 3 in Igls, Austria:
Two-Woman: (1) Helen Upperton / Heather Moyse  1:49.07 (2) Shauna Rohbock / Valerie Fleming  1:49.21 (3) Sandra Kiriasis / Romy Logsch  1:49.23
World Cup standings (3 races): (1) Upperton  642 (2) Kiriasis  635 (3) Cathleen Martini  594

Curling
European Championships in Örnsköldsvik, Sweden:
Men:
Semifinal:  2–7 
David Murdoch's Scotland will meet Thomas Ulsrud's Norway in a rematch of last year's final.
Division B semifinal:  6–4 
Division B final:  9–2 
World challenge 1:  5–6 
Finland takes the lead in the best-of-3 series.
Women:
Semifinal:  8–7 
Swedish skip Anette Norberg scores 4 points in the 9th end to advance for her 10th European final, where she'll meet old rival Mirjam Ott's Swiss team, that beat the Swedes twice in this championship.
Division B semifinal:  7–5 
Division B final:  9–3 
World challenge 1:  1–10 
Norway takes the lead in the best-of-3 series.

Figure skating
Grand Prix:
Grand Prix Final and Junior Grand Prix Final in Goyang, South Korea:
Junior pairs: (1) Lubov Iliushechkina / Nodari Maisuradze  149.38 (2) Zhang Yue / Wang Lei  137.92 (3) Ksenia Krasilnikova / Konstantin Bezmaternikh  137.22
Junior men: (1) Florent Amodio  199.58 (2) Armin Mahbanoozadeh  193.48 (3) Richard Dornbush  183.93
Senior ice dance – original dance: (1) Isabelle Delobel/Olivier Schoenfelder  60.35, (2) Oksana Domnina/Maxim Shabalin  59.33, (3) Federica Faiella/Massimo Scali  57.89
Senior men – short program: (1) Takahiko Kozuka  83.90, (2) Jeremy Abbott  78.26, (3) Brian Joubert  74.55
Senior ladies – short program: (1) Kim Yuna  65.94 (2) Mao Asada  65.38 (3) Yukari Nakano  62.08
Senior pairs – short program: (1) Aliona Savchenko/Robin Szolkowy  70.14 (2) Zhang Dan/Zhang Hao  68.34 (3) Pang Qing/Tong Jian  66.24

Skeleton
World Cup 3 in Igls, Austria:
Women: (1) Shelley Rudman  1:49.75 (2) Kerstin Szymkowiak  1:49.83 (3) Svetlana Trunova  1:50.00
World Cup standings: (1) Szymkowiak  630 (2) Anja Huber  586 3 Katie Uhlaender  568

December 11, 2008 (Thursday)

American football
National Football League Week 15 Thursday Night Football:
Chicago Bears 27, New Orleans Saints 24 (OT)
The Bears (8–6) stay in contention for a play-off berth; the Saints were eliminated from contention with the loss.

Basketball
Euroleague, week 7:(teams in bold advance to the Top-16 round)
Group A:
Air Avellino  72–86  Maccabi Tel Aviv
Maccabi (4–3) need one more win or Avellino (2–5) loss to qualify to the Top-16. As a result of Maccabi's win, Olympiacos (5–2) qualifies to the Top-16 and Le Mans (0–7) is eliminated.
Group B:
SLUC Nancy  78–70  Asseco Prokom Sopot
Nancy gets level with Sopot in 4th place on 2–5, but the Polish team hold the advantage in a tie-break due to their 29-points victory in week 2.
Panathinaikos Athens  76–87  Regal FC Barcelona
Panathinaikos (5–2) need one more win or either Sopot or Nancy loss to qualify to the Top-16.
Group C:
DKV Joventut  97–93  Lottomatica Roma
Joventut (4–3) denies Roma (5–2) a chance to clinch a berth in Top-16.
Group D:
Real Madrid  68–67  Partizan Belgrade

Cricket
England in India:
1st Test in Chennai, day 1:
 229/5 (Andrew Strauss 123)
West Indies in New Zealand:
1st Test in Dunedin, day 1:
 226/4 (Daniel Flynn 95, Chris Gayle 3/42)

Football (soccer)
FIFA Club World Cup in Japan:
Play-off:
Adelaide United  2–1  Waitakere United
Adelaide United will play  Gamba Osaka in the quarterfinal
Caribbean Championship in Jamaica:(local time, UTC−5)
Semi-finals:
 2–2 (AET) 
Grenada win 6–5 in penalty shootout.
 2–0

Handball
European Women's Championship in Macedonia(teams in bold advance to the semifinals)
Group I in Ohrid:
 21–23 
 25–30 
 31–37 
Final standings: Norway 9 pts, Spain, Romania 6, Hungary, Ukraine, Denmark 3.
Group II in Skopje:
 24–29 
 22–27 
 24–29 
Final standings: Germany 9 pts, Russia 7, Croatia, Macedonia, Sweden 4, Belarus 2.

Swimming
European Short Course Championships in Rijeka, Croatia:
Men:
400 m freestyle: (1) Paul Biedermann  3:37.73 (2) Massimiliano Rosolino  3:39.33 (3) Mads Glæsner  3:39.77
200 m backstroke: (1) Stanislav Donets  & Aschwin Wildeboer  1:49.22 (3) Pierre Roger  1:52.26
200 m individual medley: (1) James Goddard  1:53.46, (2) Vytautas Janušaitis  1:54.51, (3) Alan Cabello Forns  1:55.70
50 m freestyle: (1) Amaury Leveaux  20.63 sec, (2) Frédérick Bousquet  20.69, (3) Duje Draganja  & Evgeny Lagunov  21.15
Leveaux sets a world record of 20.48 sec in semi-final.
4 x 50 m medley relay: (1)  (Mirco Di Tora, Alessandro Terrin, Marco Belotti, Filippo Magnini) 1:32.91 (world record), (2)  (Thomas Rupprath, Marco Koch, Johannes Dietrich, Steffen Deibler) &  (Stanislav Donets, Sergei Geybel, Evgeny Korotyshkin, Evgeny Lagunov) 1:33.31
Russia set a world record of 1:33.77 in a heat earlier on Thursday.
Women:
200 m individual medley: (1) Francesca Segat  2 min 7.03 sec (European record), (2) Evelyn Verrasztó  2:07.93, (3) Sophie de Ronchi  2:08.10
200 m butterfly: (1) Petra Granlund  2 min 4.27 sec, (2) Aurore Mongel  2:04.73, (3) Jemma Lowe  2:04.78
50 m breaststroke: (1) Valentina Artemyeva  29.96 sec, (2) Janne Schaefer  30.37, (3) Moniek Nijhuis  30.45

Winter sports

Curling
European Championships in Örnsköldsvik, Sweden:(All times CET)
Men:
Play-off:
(1)  7–9 (2) 
Norway advance to the final; Germany go to the semifinal.
(3)  6–2 (4) 
Scotland go to the semifinal.
Division B play-off:
 3–8 
Finland advance to the final; Italy go to the semifinal.
 9–8 
Hungary go to the semifinal.
Women:
Round 9: (teams in bold qualify to the play-off)
 3–8 
 9–4 
 6–4 
 5–4 
 2–9 
Final standings: Switzerland, Sweden 7–2, Denmark, Germany 6–3, Italy, Scotland 5–4, Russia 4–5, Netherlands, England 2–7, Czech Republic 1–8.
Top seven teams qualify to 2009 World Championship.
Tie break for 8th place:
 6–7 
England will play against the winner of division B for a berth in 2009 World Championship.
Play-off:
(1)  8–4 (2) 
Switzerland advance to the final; Sweden go to the semifinal.
(3)  8–7 (4) 
Denmark go to the semifinal.
Division B play-off:
 6–10 
Norway advance to the final; Finland go to the semifinal.
 6–4 
Hungary go to the semifinal.

Figure skating
Grand Prix:
Grand Prix Final and Junior Grand Prix Final in Goyang, South Korea:
Junior ice dance – original dance: (1) Madison Chock / Greg Zuerlein  51.84 (2) Ekaterina Riazanova / Jonathan Guerreiro  50.85 (3) Alisa Agafonova / Dmitri Dun  49.45
Junior men – short program: (1) Florent Amodio  68.20 (2) Armin Mahbanoozadeh  67.05 (3) Richard Dornbush  66.50
Junior pairs – short program: (1) Lubov Iliushechkina / Nodari Maisuradze   56.88 (2) Ksenia Krasilnikova / Konstantin Bezmaternikh  51.54 (3) Anastasia Martiusheva / Alexei Rogonov  50.60
Junior ladies – short program: (1) Alexe Gilles  54.24 (2) Kanako Murakami  51.04 (3) Angela Maxwell  48.84

December 10, 2008 (Wednesday)

Baseball
According to reports from ESPN.com, CC Sabathia has signed a seven-year, US $160 million deal with the New York Yankees.  The deal, averaging out to nearly $23 million/year, will make Sabathia the highest paid pitcher in baseball history.

Basketball
Euroleague, week 7:(teams in bold advance to the Top-16 round)
Group A:
Cibona Zagreb  89–70  Le Mans
Le Mans' losing streak stretches to 7 games. They will be eliminated from Top-16 if Maccabi wins on Thursday.
Unicaja Málaga  60–56  Olympiacos
Cibona and Unicaja get level with Olympiacos on 5–2.
Group B:
Montepaschi Siena  100–93  Žalgiris Kaunas
Siena improve to 6–1; Žalgiris remain winless, and will be eliminated if they lose to Sopot next week.
Group C:
TAU Cerámica  101–69  Union Olimpija Ljubljana
Group D:
CSKA Moscow  93–61  Panionios
CSKA (6–1) secures a berth in the Top-16.
Efes Pilsen  74–67  AJ Milano

Football (soccer)
UEFA Champions League group stage, matchday 6:(teams in bold advance to the last-16 round; teams in italics go to UEFA Cup last-32 round; teams with strike are eliminated from all European Cups)
Group E:
Manchester United  2–2  Aalborg BK
Celtic  2–0  Villarreal
Group F:
Steaua  0–1  Fiorentina
Lyon  2–3  Bayern
Group G:
Porto  2–0  Arsenal
Dynamo Kyiv  1–0  Fenerbahçe
Group H:
Juventus  0–0  BATE Borisov
Real Madrid  3–0  Zenit St. Petersburg

Handball
European Women's Championship in Macedonia(teams in bold advance to the semifinals; teams with strike are eliminated)
Group I in Ohrid:
 40–32 
 20–34 
 26–23 
Norway secures a semifinal berth as a result of Spain's loss.
Group II in Skopje:
 24–21 
Russia secures a semifinal berth.
 24–23 
 28–28

Ice hockey
Champions Hockey League Semifinals, first leg:
Metallurg Magnitogorsk  1–2  Salavat Yulaev Ufa
ZSC Lions  6–3  Espoo Blues

Winter sports

Curling
European Championships in Örnsköldsvik, Sweden:(teams in bold qualify to the play-off)
Men:
Round 8:
 7–4 
Switzerland secures at least a tie for fourth place.
 5–6 
Scotland secures a play-off berth and eliminates France.
 2–9 
The Czechs win their 4th game in a row and remain in contention for a play-off berth.
 10–2 
Germany secures at least a tie for first place, while Sweden is eliminated.
 5–11 
Denmark stay in contention for a play-off berth.
Standings with one round remaining: Germany 7–1, Norway, Scotland 6–2, Switzerland 5–3, Czech Republic, Denmark 4–4.
Round 9:
 5–3 
 5–7 
 7–6 
 13–2 
 14–4 
Switzerland secures a play-off berth.
Final standings: Germany, Norway, Scotland 7–2, Switzerland 6–3, Denmark 5–4, Czech Republic, France 4–5, Sweden 3–6, Ireland, Spain 1–8.
Top seven teams qualify to 2009 World Championship. Sweden will play against the winner of division B for another berth.
Women:
Round 8:
 6–9 
 7–4 
Both teams secure at least a tie for a play-off berth.
 7–5 
 5–7 
 10–9 
Russia wins in 11 ends and stays in contention for a play-off berth.
Standings with one round remaining: Sweden, Switzerland 6–2, Denmark, Germany, Italy 5–3, Russia, Scotland 4–4.

December 9, 2008 (Tuesday)

Baseball
Francisco Rodríguez, who earned a record 62 saves for the Los Angeles Angels in 2008, signs a three-year, US$37 million deal to join the New York Mets.

Basketball
Euroleague, week 7:
Group C:
ALBA Berlin  72–63 Fenerbahçe Ülker 
Both teams are level in 4th place on 3–4, with identical head-to-heat record since Fenerbahçe won their first encounter 82–73.

Football (soccer)
UEFA Champions League group stage, matchday 6:(teams in bold advance to the last-16 round; teams in italics go to UEFA Cup last-32 round; teams with strike are eliminated from all European Cups)
Group A:
Chelsea  2–1  CFR Cluj
Roma  2–0  Bordeaux
Group B:
Panathinaikos  1–0  Anorthosis
Werder Bremen  2–1  Internazionale
Group C:
Basel  0–1  Sporting CP
Barcelona  2–3  Shakhtar Donetsk
Group D:
PSV Eindhoven  1–3  Liverpool
Marseille  0–0  Atlético Madrid
News: Bernd Schuster resigns as coach of Real Madrid. Juande Ramos is appointed as new coach, four days before the El Clásico against arch rival Barcelona.

Handball
European Women's Championship in Macedonia
Group I in Ohrid:
 26–24 
 18–26 
 19–31 
Standings after 3 matches: Norway 5 points, Spain & Romania 4.

Winter sports

Curling
European Championships in Örnsköldsvik, Sweden:(teams in bold qualify to the play-off)
Men:
Round 7:
 1–8 
 4–9 
 7–4 
 8–7 
 5–4 
Leaders after 7 rounds (2 remaining): Germany, Norway 6–1, Scotland 5–2, Switzerland 4–3
Women:
Round 6:
 9–4 
 9–7 
 8–3 
 13–4 
First defeat for Sweden.
 3–7 
Round 7:
 7–8 
 6–7 
 5–8 
 10–3 
 12–1 
Leaders after 7 rounds (2 remaining): Sweden 6–1, Switzerland 5–2, Denmark, Germany, Italy, Scotland 4–3

December 8, 2008 (Monday)

American football
National Football League Week 14 Monday Night Football:
Carolina Panthers 38, Tampa Bay Buccaneers 23
 The Panthers take over first place in the NFC South on the ground as DeAngelo Williams runs for 186 yards and Jonathan Stewart for 115, with each scoring two rushing touchdowns.

Baseball
 Baseball Hall of Fame balloting:
 For the fourth consecutive election in which post-World War II players were considered, the Veterans Committee fails to elect a single player, with no player gaining more than 39 of the 48 votes required for election.
 However, in the first election specifically for players whose careers began before World War II, second baseman Joe Gordon, best known for his years with the New York Yankees in the late 1930s and early 1940s, is elected by a special panel of the Veterans Committee.
 Other news:
 Greg Maddux, whose 355 wins are eighth among all Major League Baseball pitchers and second to Warren Spahn among those who pitched entirely in the post-1920 live-ball era, announces his retirement.

Basketball
NBA news: The Minnesota Timberwolves fire head coach Randy Wittman. Kevin McHale is named Wittman's replacement in an effective demotion, as McHale had been the T-Wolves' vice president of basketball operations and had the final say on all player personnel decisions. Wittman is the fourth head coach axed this season, the most in league history before Christmas.

Football (soccer)
Caribbean Championship in Jamaica:
Group I:
 0–1 
 2–2 
Cuba and Guadeloupe advance to the semifinals and qualify to 2009 CONCACAF Gold Cup

Cricket
England in India:
News: The English team arrive to Chennai for the first Test due to start there on Thursday, after it was decided on Sunday night at the team's training camp in Abu Dhabi to continue the tour.

Handball
European Women's Championship in Macedonia
Group II in Skopje:
 35–43 
 22–33 
Germany advance to the semifinal
 43–24

Winter sports

Curling
European Championships in Örnsköldsvik, Sweden:
Men:
Round 5:
 6–3 
 4–11 
 10–7 
 4–8 
 4–9 
Round 6:
 6–3 
 4–9 
 3–10 
 5–6 
 6–5 
Leaders after 6 rounds: Germany, Norway 5–1, Scotland, Switzerland 4–2, Denmark, France 3–3
Women:
Round 4:
 6–5 
 6–3 
 3–6 
 2–9 
 4–7 
Round 5:
 1–10 
 6–9 
 9–5 
 3–5 
 5–6 
Leaders after 5 rounds: Sweden 5–0, Germany, Italy, Russia, Scotland, Switzerland 3–2

December 7, 2008 (Sunday)

American football
National Football League Week 14:
New Orleans Saints 29, Atlanta Falcons 25
Indianapolis Colts 35, Cincinnati Bengals 3
Tennessee Titans 28, Cleveland Browns 9
The Titans clinch the AFC South division and a first round bye.
Houston Texans 24, Green Bay Packers 21
Chicago Bears 23, Jacksonville Jaguars 10
Minnesota Vikings 20, Detroit Lions 16
The Lions losing streak stretches to 13 games.
Philadelphia Eagles 20, New York Giants 14
Despite their defeat, the Giants clinch the NFC East as a result of Dallas' loss.
Denver Broncos 24, Kansas City Chiefs 17
Miami Dolphins 16, Buffalo Bills 3, at Toronto, Ontario
This was the first NFL regular season game to be played in Canada.
New England Patriots 24, Seattle Seahawks 21
San Francisco 49ers 24, New York Jets 14
Pittsburgh Steelers 20, Dallas Cowboys 13
The Steelers make a 17–0 run in the fourth quarter to score their 10th win.
Arizona Cardinals 34, St. Louis Rams 10
The Cardinals clinch the NFC West title and guarantee a home game in the playoffs for the first time in the franchise history since 1947, when they played the championship at Comiskey Park.
Baltimore Ravens 24, Washington Redskins 10
NCAA Bowl Championship Series:
Oklahoma and Florida are ranked 1–2 in the final BCS standings and will meet January 8 in the National Championship Game in Miami Gardens, Florida. Other BCS games: (BCS ranking in parentheses)
Rose Bowl: (8) Penn State vs. (5) Southern California
Orange Bowl: (19) Virginia Tech vs. (12) Cincinnati
Sugar Bowl: (6) Utah vs. (4) Alabama
Fiesta Bowl: (10) Ohio State vs. (3) Texas

Auto racing
V8 Supercars:
NRMA Motoring & Services Grand Finale at Sydney, Australia:
(1) Garth Tander  (2) Craig Lowndes  (3) Rick Kelly 
Final standings: (1) Jamie Whincup  3332 (2) Mark Winterbottom  3079 (3) Tander 3048
WRC:
Rally GB:
(1) Sébastien Loeb  2:43:19.6 (2) Jari-Matti Latvala  2:43:22.3 (3) Dani Sordo  2:44:30.2
Final standings: (1) Loeb 122 (2) Mikko Hirvonen  103 (3)  Sordo 65

Football (soccer)
U-20 Women's World Cup in Chile:
Third Place Playoff:  3–5 
Final:  1–2 
Goals by Sydney Leroux, the tournament's top scorer, and Alex Morgan, give the title to USA, who reverse the score in the U-17 Final last month.
Caribbean Championship in Jamaica:
Group J:
 4–2 
 1–1 
Jamaica and Grenada advance to the semifinals and qualify to 2009 CONCACAF Gold Cup

Golf
LPGA Qualifying School in Daytona Beach, Florida:
Former NCAA champion Stacy Lewis finishes as top scorer for the five-round event. Among the 19 other golfers to earn full playing privileges on the 2009 LPGA Tour is Michelle Wie, who finishes in a tie for seventh.
Father/Son Challenge in Champions Gate, Florida:
Winners: Larry Nelson and Drew Nelson

Handball
European Women's Championship in Macedonia(teams in bold advance to the main round)
Group A in Skopje:
 26–29 
 25–27 
Group B in Ohrid:
 24–24 
 34–19

Rugby union
Heineken Cup Pool stage, week 3:
Pool 1:
Clermont  25–19 (Ireland) Munster
Pool 5:
Bath  35–31  Glasgow Warriors

Winter sports

Alpine skiing
Men's World Cup in Avon, Colorado, United States:
Giant slalom: (1) Benjamin Raich  2 mins, 24.61 secs (2) Ted Ligety  2:24.62 (3) Aksel Lund Svindal  2:24.71
Overall World Cup standings (after 7 races): (1) Svindal 345 pts, (2) Hermann Maier  216, (3) Didier Défago  198
Women's World Cup in Lake Louise, Alberta, Canada:
Super giant slalom: (1) Nadia Fanchini  1 min, 20.97 secs, (2) Fabienne Suter  and Andrea Fischbacher  1:21.25
Overall World Cup standings (after 6 races): (1) Lindsey Vonn  358 points, (2) Tanja Poutiainen  260, (3) Maria Riesch  202

Biathlon
World Cup 1 in Östersund, Sweden:
Men's 12.5 km pursuit: (1) Tomasz Sikora  34:55.5 (3 penalties) (2) Ole Einar Bjørndalen  at 2.5 (3) (3) Emil Hegle Svendsen  4.9 (3)
Overall World Cup standings (after three races): (1) Svendsen 156 points (2) Sikora 143 (3) Michael Greis  130
Women's 10 km pursuit: (1) Martina Beck  32:42.4 (0 penalties) (2) Ekaterina Iourieva  at 2.6 (0) (3) Svetlana Sleptsova  29.2 (3)
Overall World Cup standings (after three races): (1) Kati Wilhelm  135 points (2) Beck 128 (3) Tora Berger  128

Bobsleigh
World Cup 2 in Altenberg, Germany
Four-man: (1) Karl Angerer  56.58 (2) André Lange  and Alexandr Zubkov  56.77

Cross-country skiing
World Cup in La Clusaz, France
Men's 4x10 km relay: (1)  1:39:01.0 (2)  1:39:03.2 +02.20 (3)  1:39:07.6 +06.60
Women's 4x5 km relay: (1)  1:00:46.3 (2)  1:01:19.7 +33.39 (3)  1:01:20.8 +34.50

Curling
European Championships in Örnsköldsvik, Sweden:
Men:
Round 3:
 8–6 
 10–3 
 0–9 
 8–3 
 7–4 
Round 4:
 6–5 
 7–8 
 10–4 
 10–5 
 4–9 
Women:
Round 3:
 6–7 
 8–3 
 7–4 
 9–8 
 8–1

Luge
World Cup 2 in Sigulda, Latvia
Men: (1) Albert Demtschenko  (2) Armin Zöggeler  (3) David Möller

Nordic combined
World Cup in Trondheim, Norway:(position after jump competition in brackets)
10 km Gundersen: (1) (1) Anssi Koivuranta  24 mins 41.9 secs (2) (3) Björn Kircheisen  at 25.9 (3) (9) Jason Lamy-Chappuis  34.6
World Cup standings (after 4 of 24 events): (1) Koivuranta 320 points (2) Magnus Moan  196 (3) Ronny Ackermann  193

Short track speed skating
World Cup 4 in Nagano, Japan

Ski jumping
World Cup in Trondheim, Norway:
Individual 131 m hill: (1) Simon Ammann  280.2 points (140/135 m), (2) Matti Hautamäki  278.3 (137/135 m), (3) Gregor Schlierenzauer  274.8 (134.5/135 m)
World Cup standings (after three of 34 rounds): (1) Ammann 245 pts, (2) Schlierenzauer  220, (3) Ville Larinto  145

Speed skating
World Cup 4 in Changchun, China:
Men's 100 m: (1) Yuya Oikawa  9.45 (2) Lee Kang-Seok  9.61 (3) Yu Fengtong  9.89
Men's 500 m (2): (1) Dmitry Lobkov  35.07 (2) Yu Fengtong  35.09 +0.02 (3) Keiichiro Nagashima  35.20 +0.13
Men's 1000 m (2): (1) Simon Kuipers  1:09.83 (2) Shani Davis  1:09.99 +0.16 (3) Stefan Groothuis  1:10.01 +0.18
Women's 100 m: (1) Jenny Wolf  10.23 (2) Xing Aihua  10.27 (3) Lee Sang-hwa KOR 10.67
Women's 500 m (2): (1) Jenny Wolf  37.98 (2) Annette Gerritsen  38.52 +0.54 (3) Lee Sang-hwa  38.56 +0.58
Women's 1000 m (2): (1) Laurine van Riessen  1:17.25 (2) Kristina Groves  1:17.80 +0.55 (3) Shannon Rempel  1:18.27 +1.02

December 6, 2008 (Saturday)

American college football
NCAA Top 25:(BCS Ranking in parentheses)
SEC Championship Game in Atlanta:
(4) Florida 31, (1) Alabama 20
The Gators stop the Crimson Tide's winning streak, and will probably get a berth in the National Championship Game, while Alabama could go to the Sugar Bowl.
Big 12 Championship Game in Kansas City:
(2) Oklahoma 62, (20) Missouri 21
The Sooners, who hit the 60-point mark for the fifth straight week, are likely to get the top spot in the rankings and play in the Championship Game.
(5) Southern California 28, UCLA 7
The Trojans clinch the Pac-10 Championship and a return trip to the Rose Bowl on January 1 to meet Penn State.
(13) Cincinnati 29, Hawaii 24
Down 24–10, the Bearcats use their defense to come back and win.
ACC Championship Game in Tampa:
(25) Virginia Tech 30, (17) Boston College 12
The Hokies will play in the 2009 Orange Bowl, most likely against the Bearcats.
(23) Pittsburgh 34, UConn 10
In other notable D-I FBS games:
Conference USA Championship Game:
East Carolina 27, Tulsa 24
The Pirates win their first league title since 1976 and the trip to the Liberty Bowl against an SEC team, later determined to be Kentucky, on January 2.
Troy 35, Arkansas State 9
The Trojans win the Sun Belt Championship outright, and with it a trip to the New Orleans Bowl to meet Southern Miss.
Army–Navy Game in Philadelphia:
Navy 34, Army 0
The Midshipmen win the Commander-in-Chief's Trophy for the sixth consecutive year and beat the Black Knights for the seventh time in a row in the biggest shutout in the series since 1973.
As a result of Alabama and Ball State losses in their conference championship games, Utah and Boise State remain the only two teams with undefeated records going into the bowl post-season.
In the NCAA Division I Football Championship:
 Richmond 33, Appalachian State 13
 The Mountaineers' run of three consecutive FCS championships ends in the quarterfinals, with the Spiders taking advantage of five second-half interceptions of ASU quarterback Armanti Edwards.
Minnesota-Duluth and Northwest Missouri State University advance to the 2008 NCAA Division II National Football Championship game after defeating California University of Pennsylvania and University of North Alabama in the semifinals.

Auto racing
V8 Supercars:
NRMA Motoring & Services Grand Finale at Sydney, Australia:
Jamie Whincup  secures his first V8 Supercars championship after winning the first of three races held over two days.

Boxing
The Dream Match at the MGM Grand Garden, Las Vegas, Nevada:
 Manny Pacquiao wins with a ninth-round TKO of  Oscar De La Hoya as "The Golden Boy" refuses to answer the bell after the eighth round.
 Juan Manuel López KOs  Sergio Medina in the first round to retain the junior featherweight title.
 Victor Ortíz KOs  Jeff Resto in the second round.

Football (soccer)
Caribbean Championship in Jamaica:
Group I:
 3–0 
Cuba advance to the semifinal and qualify to 2009 CONCACAF Gold Cup
 2–3

Handball
European Women's Championship in Macedonia(teams in bold advance to the main round)
Group C in Ohrid:
 19–19 
 21–31 
Group D in Skopje:
 32–27 
 31–30

Rugby union
Heineken Cup Pool stage, week 3:
Pool 2:
Leinster (Ireland) 33–3  Castres
Pool 3:
Ospreys  68–8  Treviso
Leicester Tigers  38–27  Perpignan
Pool 4:
Stade Français  10–15  Harlequins
Quins win in front of a hostile crowd of 76,569 at Stade de France, the largest ever to attend a Heineken Cup pool match.
Pool 5:
Toulouse  26–7  Newport Gwent Dragons
Pool 6:
Calvisano  17–40  Gloucester
Sevens World Series:
South Africa Sevens in George:
Cup Final:  7–12

Winter sports

Alpine skiing
Men's World Cup in Avon, Colorado, United States:
Super giant slalom: (1) Aksel Lund Svindal  1 min 13.05 secs, (2) Hermann Maier  1:13.50, (3) Michael Walchhofer  1:13.63
Women's World Cup in Lake Louise, Alberta, Canada:
Downhill: cancelled

Biathlon
World Cup 1 in Östersund, Sweden:
Men's 10 km sprint: (1) Emil Hegle Svendsen  25 min 42.3 sec (1 penalty) (2) Tomasz Sikora  at 12.7 (1) (3) Simon Fourcade  28.1 (0)
Women's 7.5 km sprint: (1) Wang Chunli  22 min 48.1 sec (0) (2) Tora Berger  22:49.5 +1.4 (0) (3) Magdalena Neuner  22:52.9 +4.8 (0)

Bobsleigh
World Cup 2 in Altenberg, Germany:
Two-man: (1) André Lange / Kevin Kuske  1:52.60 (2) Steven Holcomb / Justin Olsen  1:52.85 (+0.25) (3) Beat Hefti / Thomas Lamparter  1:53.11 (+0.51)
Two-woman: (1) Sandra Kiriasis / Berit Wiacker  1:55.71 (2) Cathleen Martini / Janine Tischer  1:55.73 (+0.02) (3) Shauna Rohbock / Elana Meyers  1:56.12 (+0.41)

Cross-country skiing
World Cup in La Clusaz, France:
Men's 30 km freestyle mass start: (1) Petter Northug  1 hr 19 min 26.5 sec (2) Dario Cologna  1:19:26.8 (3) Alexander Legkov  1:19:28.5
Women's 15 km freestyle mass start: (1) Kristin Størmer Steira  42:56.0 (2) Aino-Kaisa Saarinen  43:09.0 (3) Therese Johaug  43:10.0

Curling
European Championships in Örnsköldsvik, Sweden:
Men:
Round 1:
 3–6 
 8–4 
 13–1 
 6–5 
 9–1 
Round 2:
 5–10 
 13–1 
 12–8 
 10–3 
 8–3 
Women:
Round 1:
 8–2 
 8–7 
 3–10 
 6–7 
 6–7 
Round 2:
 4–9 
 5–10 
 12–2 
 9–6 
 3–7

Luge
World Cup 2 in Sigulda, Latvia:
Women: (1)  Tatjana Hüfner (2)  Natalia Yakushenko (3)  Anke Wischnewski
Doubles: (1)  Christian Oberstolz / Patrick Gruber (2)  Andreas Linger / Wolfgang Linger (3)  Peter Penz / Georg Fischler

Nordic combined
World Cup in Trondheim, Norway:
10 km Gundersen: (1) Magnus Moan  (2) Jason Lamy-Chappuis  (3) Anssi Koivuranta

Short track speed skating
World Cup 4 in Nagano, Japan:
Women's 1500 m: (1) Kim Min-jung  2:21.238 (2) Shin Sae-bom  2:21.369 (3) Allison Baver  2:22.046
Women's 1000 m: (1) Wang Meng  1:30.790 (2) Liu Qiuhong  1:30.976 (3) Yang Shin-young  1:31.098
Men's 1500 m: (1) Lee Jung-su  2:16.242 (2) Sung Si-bak  2:16.478 (3) François-Louis Tremblay  2:17.073
Men's 1000 m: (1) Lee Ho-suk  1:29.171 (2) Kwak Yoon-gy  1:29.516 (3) Charles Hamelin  1:29.519

Ski jumping
World Cup in Trondheim, Norway:
Individual 131 m hill: (1) Gregor Schlierenzauer  285.7 points (140.0/135.0 m), (2) Ville Larinto  278.9 (138.5/138.0 m), (3) Anders Jacobsen  278.8 (134.0/138.0 m)

Snowboarding
World Cup in Grenoble, France:
Men's Big Air: (1) Mathieu Crepel  (2) Stefan Gimpl  (3) Jaakko Ruha

Speed skating
World Cup 4 in Changchun, China:
Men's 500 m (1): (1) Yu Fengtong  34.97 sec (2) Keiichiro Nagashima  35.08 +0.11 (3) Lee Kyou-Hyuk  35.27 +0.30
Men's 1000 m (1): (1) Lee Kyou-Hyuk  1 min 9.68 sec (2) Stefan Groothuis  1:10.15 +0.47 (3) Shani Davis   1:10.32 +0.64
Women's 500 m (1): (1) Jenny Wolf  38.09 sec (2) Lee Sang-hwa  38.71 +0.62 (3) Annette Gerritsen  38.86 +0.77
Women's 1000 m (1): (1) Kristina Groves  1 min 18.18 sec (2) Shannon Rempel  1:18.20 +0.02 (3) Laurine van Riessen  1:18.48 +0.30

December 5, 2008 (Friday)

American football
NCAA Top 25:
MAC Championship Game in Detroit:
Buffalo 42, (12) Ball State 24
The Bulls shock the previously unbeaten Cardinals and will go to Toronto for the International Bowl, the first bowl game in their history.
News:
Former NFL star O. J. Simpson is sentenced to a maximum of 33 years in prison, with the possibility of parole after 9 years, after being convicted of kidnapping and robbery of two sports memorabilia dealers in Las Vegas.

Cricket
England in India:
News: The England cricket team is training in Abu Dhabi, while ECB officials and a security advisor inspect the security conditions in Chennai and Mohali, the cities scheduled to host the two Test matches. The delegation is due to report its findings to the team on Sunday, and then a decision should be made whether the tour will continue with the first Test in Chennai next Thursday.

Football (soccer)
Caribbean Championship in Jamaica:
Group J:
 1–2 
 4–0

Handball
European Women's Championship in Macedonia(teams in bold advance to the main round)
Group A in Skopje:
 30–25 
 26–26 
Group B in Ohrid:
 29–24 
 20–33

Rugby union
Heineken Cup Pool stage, week 3:
Pool 1:
Sale Sharks  36–6  Montauban
Pool 2:
Edinburtgh  16–25  London Wasps
Pool 4:
Ulster (Ireland) 26–16  Scarlets
Pool 6:
Cardiff Blues  21–17  Biarritz

Winter sports

Alpine skiing
Men's World Cup in Avon, Colorado, United States:
Downhill: (1) Aksel Lund Svindal  1 min 43.85 secs (2) Marco Buechel  1:43.91 (3) Erik Guay  1:44.20
Women's World Cup in Lake Louise, Alberta, Canada:
Downhill: (1) Lindsey Vonn  1 min 26.10 secs (2) Nadia Fanchini  1:26.71 (3) Maria Riesch  1:26.79

Skeleton
World Cup 2 in Altenberg, Germany:
Men: (1) Frank Rommel  1:57.41 (2) Martins Dukurs  1:57.53 (3) Sandro Stielicke  1:57.77
Women: (1) Anja Huber  1:59.82 (2) Kerstin Szymkowiak  1:59.95 (3) Maya Pedersen  2:00.81

December 4, 2008 (Thursday)

American football
National Football League Week 14 Thursday Night Football:
San Diego Chargers 34, Oakland Raiders 7
The win keeps the Chargers in contention for the AFC West Division title or wild card playoff berth, while the Raiders are eliminated.

Basketball
Euroleague, week 6:(teams in bold advance to the top-16 round)
Group A:
Maccabi Tel Aviv  88–83  Cibona Zagreb
Cibona's second loss in succession means Olympiacos (5–1) have sole possession of first place in this group.
Group B:
Regal FC Barcelona  91–68  SLUC Nancy
Barça and Montepaschi Siena  (both 5–1) are the first clubs that secure qualification to the Top 16 stage. 
Žalgiris Kaunas  69–80  Panathinaikos Athens
With this win over winless Žalgiris Panathinaikos becomes the fifth team that reaches 300 wins in Euroleague history, following Real Madrid, CSKA Moscow, Maccabi Tel Aviv and FC Barcelona. Panathinaikos (5–1) still need another win or a Nancy loss to advance.
Group C:
Fenerbahçe Ülker  69–81  TAU Cerámica
Union Olimpija Ljubljana  65–86  DKV Joventut
Lottomatica Roma  70–64  ALBA Berlin
Roma (5–1) lead the group ahead of TAU (4–2)

Football (soccer)
UEFA Cup group stage, matchday 4:(teams in bold advance to the last-32 round; teams with strike are eliminated)
Group E:
Wolfsburg  3–2  Portsmouth
Heerenveen  1–2  Braga
Idle: Milan 
Group F:
Slavia Prague  0–2  Hamburg
Aston Villa  1–2  Žilina
Idle: Ajax Amsterdam 
Group G:
Valencia  1–1  Club Brugge
Copenhagen  1–1  Rosenborg
Idle: Saint-Étienne 
Group H:
Lech Poznań  1–1  Deportivo La Coruña
Nancy  3–4  CSKA Moscow
CSKA secure first place in the group behind a hat-trick from Vágner Love.
Idle: Feyenoord 
U-20 Women's World Cup in Chile:
Semifinals:
 1–2 
Ri Ye Gyong's winning goal 3 minutes into injury time puts North Korea one match away from defending its title.
 1–0 
Sydney Leroux's fifth goal in the tournament sets up a repeat of the recent U-17 Women's World Cup Final.
Caribbean Championship in Jamaica:
Group I:
 1–2 
 1–1

Handball
European Women's Championship in Macedonia:(All times CET; teams in bold advance to the main round)
Group C in Ohrid:
 10–24 
 25–29 
Group D in Skopje:
 31–32 
 31–29

Winter sports

Biathlon
World Cup 1 in Östersund, Sweden:
Women's 15 km individual: (1) Helena Jonsson  45:05.1 (0+0+0+0) (2) Kati Wilhelm  45:44.8 (1+0+0+0) Ekaterina Iourieva  46:15.4 (0+0+1+0)

December 3, 2008 (Wednesday)

American college football
Louisiana-Lafayette 42, Middle Tennessee 28
With the win, the Ragin' Cajuns become bowl eligible, and will win the Sun Belt championship and a trip to the New Orleans Bowl if Troy loses to Arkansas State on Saturday.
 News:
 Tommy Tuberville resigns as Auburn head coach.
 Notre Dame announces Charlie Weis will stay on as head coach at least through the 2009 season.

Basketball
Euroleague, week 6:
Group A:
Olympiacos  91–66  Air Avellino
Le Mans  55–87  Unicaja Málaga
Olympiacos improve to 5–1, while Le Mans remain winless
Group B:
Asseco Prokom Sopot  71–83  Montepaschi Siena
Siena also improve to 5–1
Group D:
Panionios  68–66  Real Madrid
Partizan Belgrade  83–77  Efes Pilsen
AJ Milano  80–79  CSKA Moscow
CSKA suffer its first defeat.
NBA news: The Toronto Raptors fire Sam Mitchell as head coach, making him the league's third head coach axed this season. His interim replacement is assistant Jay Triano, the first Canadian coach in NBA history.

Football (soccer)
Copa Sudamericana final, second leg: (first leg result in parentheses)
Internacional  1(1)–1(0)  Estudiantes
Nilmar's goal 6 minutes from the end of extra time gives Internacional a 2–1 win on aggregate
UEFA Cup group stage, matchday 4:(teams in bold advance to the last-32 round; teams with strike are eliminated)
Group A:
Twente Enschede  2–1  Schalke 04
Manchester City  0–0  Paris Saint-Germain
Idle: Racing Santander 
Group B:
Hertha Berlin  0–1  Galatasaray
Metalist Kharkiv  1–0  Olympiacos Piraeus
Idle: Benfica 
Group C:
Sevilla  3–0  Partizan Belgrade
Standard Liège  3–0  Sampdoria
Idle: Stuttgart 
Group D:
Spartak Moscow  1–2  NEC Nijmegen
Udinese  2–1  Dinamo Zagreb
Idle: Tottenham Hotspur 
Caribbean Championship in Jamaica:
Group J:
 1–2 
 2–1

Handball
European Women's Championship in Macedonia:
Group A in Skopje:
 21–27 
 23–24 
Group B in Ohrid:
 24–38 
 21–21

Ice hockey
Champions Hockey League:
Group stage, matchday 6:(teams in bold advance to the semifinals)
Group A: Eisbären Berlin  2–1  Metallurg Magnitogorsk
Group B: HV71  0–6  Espoo Blues
Group C: Salavat Yulaev Ufa  8–2  HC Slovan Bratislava
Group D: HC Slavia Praha  1–5  ZSC Lions

Rugby union
End of year tests:
Barbarians 11–18  in London

Winter sports

Biathlon
World Cup 1 in Östersund, Sweden:
Men's 20 km individual: (1) Michael Greis   58:52.5 (0+1+0+0) (2) Alexander Os  59:43.0 (0+0+0+2) (3) Emil Hegle Svendsen  59:47.5 (0+2+0+0)

December 2, 2008 (Tuesday)

American football
 NFL news:
 The New York Giants suspend Plaxico Burress for the remainder of the season, a day after he was charged with felony weapons possession stemming from an incident in which he accidentally shot himself.

Handball
European Women's Championship in Macedonia:
Group C in Ohrid:
 21–21 
 31–22 
Group D in Skopje:
 30–26 
 25–22

December 1, 2008 (Monday)

American football
National Football League Week 13 Monday Night Football:
 Houston Texans 30, Jacksonville Jaguars 17
 News:
 New York Giants wide receiver Plaxico Burress is charged with two felony counts of weapons possession, three days after accidentally shooting himself in the right thigh at a Manhattan nightclub.
College football news:
Tennessee names Lane Kiffin head coach of the Volunteers.
Dabo Swinney will become permanent head coach of the Clemson Tigers.

Cricket
New Zealand in Australia:
2nd Test in Adelaide, day 4:
 270 (98.3 overs) & 203 (74.1 overs);  535 (157.4 overs). Australia win by an innings and 62 runs and win the series 2–0.

Football (soccer)
U-20 Women's World Cup in Chile:
Quarterfinals:
 1–2 
Defending champion North Korea win the all-Asian battle and earn a semifinal match against France.
 2–3 
Twins Sylvie and Nicole Banecki score a goal each for Germany, that eliminate the reigning bronze medallists and will next play USA in a repeat of 2002 and  2004 semifinals. On the previous two occasions, the winner went on to win the title.

References

12